Va'etchanan ( — Hebrew for "and I pleaded," the first word in the parashah) is the 45th weekly Torah portion (parashah) in the annual Jewish cycle of Torah reading and the second in the Book of Deuteronomy. It comprises . The parashah tells how Moses asked to see the Land of Israel, made arguments to obey the law, recounted setting up the Cities of Refuge, recited the Ten Commandments and the Shema, and gave instructions for the Israelites' conquest of the Land.

The parashah is made up of 7,343 Hebrew letters, 1,878 Hebrew words, 122 verses, and 249 lines in a Torah Scroll (Sefer Torah). Jews in the Diaspora generally read it in late July or August.

It is always read on the special Sabbath Shabbat Nachamu, the Sabbath immediately after Tisha B'Av. As the parashah describes how the Israelites would sin and be banished from the Land of Israel, Jews also read part of the parashah  as the Torah reading for the morning (Shacharit) prayer service on Tisha B'Av, which commemorates the destruction of both the First Temple and Second Temple in Jerusalem.

Readings
In the masoretic text of the Tanakh (Hebrew Bible), Parashah Va'etchanan has six "open portion" (petuchah) divisions (roughly equivalent to paragraphs, often abbreviated with the Hebrew letter  (peh)). Parashah Va'etchanan has several further subdivisions, called "closed portions" (setumah) (abbreviated with the Hebrew letter  (samekh)) within the open portion divisions. The first reading is divided by the first open portion. From the middle of the first reading to the middle of the second reading is the second open section. The third open portion concludes the second reading. The fourth open portion corresponds to the third reading. The fifth open portion spans the fourth and fifth readings. And the sixth open portion spans the sixth and seventh readings. Several closed portion divisions, notably one for every commandment, further divide the fourth and sixth readings.

First reading — Deuteronomy 3:23–4:4
In the first reading, Moses pleaded with God to let him cross over and see the other side of the Jordan River. But God was wrathful with Moses and would not listen, telling Moses never to speak of the matter again, and Moses blamed his punishment on the Israelites. God directed Moses to climb the summit of Pisgah and look at the land. And God told Moses to give Joshua his instructions and imbue him with strength and courage, for Joshua was to lead the people and allot to them the land. The first open portion ends here with the end of the chapter.

Moses exhorted the Israelites to heed God's laws, not to add anything to them, and not to take anything away from them, so that they might live to enter and occupy the land that God was giving them. Moses noted that in the sin of Baal-peor, God wiped out every person who followed Baal-peor, while preserving alive those who held fast to God. The first reading ends here.

Second reading — Deuteronomy 4:5–40
In the second reading, Moses argued that observing the laws faithfully would prove to other peoples the Israelites' wisdom and discernment, for no other great nation had a god so close at hand as God, and no other great nation had laws as perfect as God's.

Moses urged the Israelites to take utmost care not to forget the things that they saw, and to make them known to their children and children's children: How they stood before God at Horeb, the mountain was ablaze with flames, God spoke to them out of the fire, and God declared to them the Ten Commandments. At the same time, God commanded Moses to impart to the Israelites laws for them to observe in the land that they were about to occupy.

Because the Israelites saw no shape when God spoke to them out of the fire at Horeb, Moses warned them not to make for themselves a sculptured image in any likeness whatever — the form of a man, woman, beast, bird, creeping thing, or fish. And when they looked up and saw the sun, moon, stars, and heaven, they were not to be lured into bowing down to them or serving them, for God allotted those things to other peoples, but God took the Israelites and brought them out of Egypt to be God's very own people.

Moses said that God was angry with him on account of the Israelites, and God swore that Moses would not enter the land but would die in the land east of the Jordan. Moses cautioned the Israelites not to forget the covenant that God concluded with them, and not to make a sculptured image, for God is a consuming fire, an impassioned God. The second open portion ends here.

Moses called heaven and earth to witness against the Israelites that should they make for themselves a sculptured image when they were in the land, then God would scatter them among the peoples, leaving only a scant few alive. There in exile they would serve man-made gods of wood and stone, that would not be able to see, hear, eat, or smell. But when they were in distress and they searched for God with all their heart and soul, returned to God, and obeyed God, then they would find God, even there. For God is a compassionate God, Who would not fail them, let them perish, or forget the covenant that He made on oath with their fathers.

Moses invited the Israelites to consider whether any people had ever heard the voice of a god speaking out of a fire and survived, or any god had taken one nation from the midst of another by prodigious acts and awesome power as their God had done for them in Egypt before their very eyes. Moses said that it had been clearly demonstrated to them that the Lord alone is God and that there is none beside God. Moses thus admonished them to observe God's laws and commandments, which Moses enjoined upon them that day, that it might go well with them and their children, and that they might long remain in the land that God was assigning to them for all time. The second reading and the third open portion end here.

Third reading — Deuteronomy 4:41–49

In the third reading, Moses set aside three cities of refuge on the east side of the Jordan to which a manslayer who unwittingly slew a person without having been hostile to him in the past could escape and live: Bezer among the Reubenites, Ramoth in Gilead among the Gadites, and Golan in Bashan among the Manassites.

Fourth reading — Deuteronomy 5:1–18 (or 5:1–22)
In the fourth reading, Moses summoned the Israelites and called on them to hear the laws that he proclaimed that day, to study and observe them faithfully. At Horeb, God made a covenant with them — not with their fathers, but with them, the living, every one of them. God spoke to them face to face out of the fire on the mountain. Moses stood between God and them to convey God's words to them, for they were afraid of the fire and did not go up the mountain. A closed portion ends here.

God said the Ten Commandments:
"I the Lord am your God."
"You shall have no other gods beside Me. You shall not make for yourself a sculptured image, any likeness of what is in the heavens above, or on the earth below, or in the waters below the earth. You shall not bow down to them or serve them."
"You shall not swear falsely by the name of the Lord your God." A closed portion ends here.
"Observe the Sabbath day and keep it holy."
"Honor your father and your mother." A closed portion ends here.
"You shall not murder." A closed portion ends here.
"You shall not commit adultery." A closed portion ends here.
"You shall not steal." A closed portion ends here.
"You shall not bear false witness against your neighbor." A closed portion ends here.
"You shall not covet your neighbor's wife. A closed portion ends here. You shall not crave your neighbor's house, or his field, or his male or female slave, or his ox, or his ass, or anything that is your neighbor's." The fourth reading and a closed portion ends here.

Fifth reading — Deuteronomy 5:19 (23)–6:3
In the fifth reading, God spoke these words to the whole congregation at the mountain, with a mighty voice out of the fire and the dense clouds, and God inscribed them on two stone tablets, which God gave to Moses. When the Israelites heard the voice out of the darkness and saw the mountain ablaze with fire, the tribal heads and elders asked Moses to hear all that God had to say and then tell the people, and they would willingly obey.

Sixth reading — Deuteronomy 6:4–25
In the sixth reading, Moses imparted God's instructions, the Shema and V'ahavta, saying: "Hear, O Israel: the Lord our God, the Lord is one. And you shall love the Lord your God with all your heart, and with all your soul, and with all your might. And these words, which I command you this day, shall be upon your heart; and you shall teach them diligently to your children, and shall talk of them when you sit in your house, and when you walk by the way, and when you lie down, and when thou rise up. And you shall bind them for a sign upon your hand, and they shall be for frontlets between your eyes. And you shall write them upon the doorposts of your house, and upon your gates." A closed portion ends here.

Moses exhorted the Israelites, when God brought them into the land and they ate their fill, not to forget the God who freed them from bondage in Egypt, to revere and worship only God, and to swear only by God's name. Moses warned the Israelites not to follow other gods, lest the anger of God wipe them off the face of the earth. A closed portion ends here.

Moses warned the Israelites not to try God, as they did at Massah, but to keep God's commandments and do what is right in God's sight, that it might go well with them, that they might be able to possess the land, and that all their enemies might be driven out before them. A closed portion ends here.

And when their children would ask the meaning of the commandments, they were to answer that they were slaves to Pharaoh in Egypt, and God produced marvelous and destructive signs and portents, freed them with a mighty hand to give them the land, and then commanded them to observe all these laws for their lasting good and survival.

Seventh reading — Deuteronomy 7:1–11
In the seventh reading, Moses told the Israelites that when God brought them to the land and dislodged seven nations before them — the Hittites, Girgashites, Amorites, Canaanites, Perizzites, Hivites, and Jebusites — the Israelites were to doom them to destruction, grant them no terms, and give them no quarter. The Israelites were not to intermarry with them, for they would turn the Israelites' children away from God to worship other gods, and God's anger would wipe the Israelites out. The Israelites were to tear down the nations' altars, smash their pillars, cut down their sacred posts, and consign their images to the fire.

The Israelites were a people consecrated to God, and God chose them from all the peoples on earth to be God's treasured people. God chose them not because they were the most numerous of peoples, but because God favored them and kept the oath God made with their fathers. Moses told them to note that only God is God, the steadfast God who keeps God's covenant faithfully to the thousandth generation of those who love God and keep God's commandments, but who instantly requites with destruction those who reject God.

Readings according to the triennial cycle
Jews who read the Torah according to the triennial cycle of Torah reading read the parashah according to a different schedule.

In ancient parallels
The parashah has parallels in these ancient sources:

Deuteronomy chapter 5
The early third millennium BCE Sumerian wisdom text Instructions of Shuruppak contains maxims that parallel the Ten Commandments, including:
Don’t steal anything; don’t kill yourself! . . .
My son, don’t commit murder . . .
Don’t laugh with a girl if she is married; the slander (arising from it) is strong! . . .
Don’t plan lies; it is discrediting . . .
Don’t speak fraudulently; in the end it will bind you like a trap.

Noting that Sargon of Akkad was the first to use a seven-day week, Professor Gregory S. Aldrete of the University of Wisconsin–Green Bay speculated that the Israelites may have adopted the idea from the Akkadian Empire.

Deuteronomy chapter 6
Similarly, the Middle Egyptian (early second millennium BCE) tale of Sinuhe Palestine described the Land of Israel or, as the Egyptian tale called it, the land of Yaa: "It was a good land called Yaa. Figs were in it and grapes. It had more wine than water. Abundant was its honey, plentiful its oil. All kind of fruit were on its trees. Barley was there and emmer, and no end of cattle of all kinds."

In inner-Biblical interpretation
The parashah has parallels or is discussed in these Biblical sources:

Deuteronomy chapter 4

In , Egypt is described as an "iron furnace". Solomon used the same image in his prayer at the dedication of the temple he built in Jerusalem..

Similarly, Psalm  reports that God "summoned the heavens above, and the earth, for the trial of His people," saying "Bring in My devotees, who made a covenant with Me over sacrifice!"  continues: "Then the heavens proclaimed His righteousness, for He is a God who judges."

Deuteronomy chapter 5

The Sabbath
 refers to the Sabbath. Commentators note that the Hebrew Bible repeats the commandment to observe the Sabbath 12 times.

 reports that on the seventh day of Creation, God finished God's work, rested, and blessed and hallowed the seventh day.

The Sabbath is one of the Ten Commandments.  commands that one remember the Sabbath day, keep it holy, and not do any manner of work or cause anyone under one's control to work, for in six days God made heaven and earth and rested on the seventh day, blessed the Sabbath, and hallowed it.  commands that one observe the Sabbath day, keep it holy, and not do any manner of work or cause anyone under one's control to work — so that one's subordinates might also rest — and remember that the Israelites were servants in the land of Egypt, and God brought them out with a mighty hand and by an outstretched arm.

And God told Moses to let no one go out of one's place on the seventh day.

In , just before giving Moses the second Tablets of Stone, God commanded that the Israelites keep and observe the Sabbath throughout their generations, as a sign between God and the children of Israel forever, for in six days God made heaven and earth, and on the seventh day God rested.

In , just before issuing the instructions for the Tabernacle, Moses again told the Israelites that no one should work on the Sabbath, specifying that one must not kindle fire on the Sabbath.

In , God told Moses to repeat the Sabbath commandment to the people, calling the Sabbath a holy convocation.

The prophet Isaiah taught in  that iniquity is inconsistent with the Sabbath. In , the prophet taught that if people turn away from pursuing or speaking of business on the Sabbath and call the Sabbath a delight, then God will make themride upon the high places of the earth and will feed them with the heritage of Jacob.

The prophet Jeremiah taught in  that the fate of Jerusalem depended on whether the people obstained from work on the Sabbath, refraining from carrying burdens outside their houses and through the city gates.

The prophet Ezekiel told in  how God gave the Israelites God's Sabbaths, to be a sign between God and them, but the Israelites rebelled against God by profaning the Sabbaths, provoking God to pour out God's fury upon them, but God stayed God's hand.

In , Nehemiah told how he saw some treading winepresses on the Sabbath, and others bringing all manner of burdens into Jerusalem on the Sabbath day, so when it began to be dark before the Sabbath, he commanded that the city gates be shut and not opened till after the Sabbath and directed the Levites to keep the gates to sanctify the Sabbath.

To walk in God’s ways

Deuteronomy chapter 6
 echoes , "The Eternal is our God, the Eternal alone," when the prophet foretells, "The Lord shall be King over all the earth; in that day there shall be one Lord with one name."

In , Joshua quoted  to the Reubenites, Gadites, and Manassites, cautioning them to take diligent heed to do the commandment and the law that Moses the servant of the Lord commanded.

 parallels . Both  and  speak of the commandments' presence while sleeping, waking, and traveling — with the commandments in  taking on the active roles of leading, watching over, and talking. Both  and  speak of binding the commandments to one's person —  to hand and forehead,  to heart and throat.

In , Moses cautioned the Israelites not test God.

Deuteronomy chapter 7
Sommer argued that , for example, quoted , which was already an authoritative and holy text, but revised the morally troubling part: Where  taught that God punishes sin for generations,  maintained that God does not contend forever. Sommer argued that  and  similarly quoted  with revision. Rather, they repeat  while also disagreeing with part of it.

In early nonrabbinic interpretation
The parashah has parallels or is discussed in these early nonrabbinic sources:

Deuteronomy chapter 4

Deuteronomy chapter 5

Clement of Alexandria first used the Greek term that became the English word "Decalogue" to describe the Ten Commandments in about 200 C.E.

 told how in the 2nd century BCE, many followers of the pious Jewish priest Mattathias rebelled against the Seleucid king Antiochus IV Epiphanes. Antiochus's soldiers attacked a group of them on the Sabbath, and when the Pietists failed to defend themselves so as to honor the Sabbath (commanded in, among other places), a thousand died.  reported that when Mattathias and his friends heard, they reasoned that if they did not fight on the Sabbath, they would soon be destroyed. So they decided that they would fight against anyone who attacked them on the Sabbath.

Echoing , "You shall observe to do therefore as the Lord your God has commanded you; you shall not turn aside to the right hand or to the left," the Community Rule of the Qumran sectarians provided, “They shall not depart from any command of God concerning their times; they shall be neither early nor late for any of their appointed times, they shall stray neither to the right nor to the left of any of His true precepts.”

Deuteronomy chapter 6
Yigael Yadin observed that Qumran sectarians used tefillin and mezuzot quite similar to those in use today.

In classical rabbinic interpretation
The parashah is discussed in these rabbinic sources from the era of the Mishnah and the Talmud:

Deuteronomy chapter 3
Noting that  and  both use the same expression, "at that time," a Midrash deduced that the events of the two verses took place at the same time. Thus Rav Huna taught that as soon as God told Moses to hand over his office to Joshua, Moses immediately began to pray to be permitted to enter the Promised land. The Midrash compared Moses to a governor who could be sure that the king would confirm whatever orders he gave so long as he retained his office. The governor redeemed whomever he desired and imprisoned whomever he desired. But as soon as the governor retired and another was appointed in his place, the gatekeeper would not let him enter the king's palace. Similarly, as long as Moses remained in office, he imprisoned whomever he desired and released whomever he desired, but when he was relieved of his office and Joshua was appointed in his stead, and he asked to be permitted to enter the Promised Land, God in  denied his request.

The Gemara deduced from Moses's example in  that one should seek a suppliant frame of mind before praying. Rav Huna and Rav Hisda were discussing how long to wait between recitations of the Amidah if one erred in the first reciting and needed to repeat the prayer.

Rabbi Eleazar deduced from  that God let Moses see the Promised Land only because Moses prayed, and thus Rabbi Eleazar concluded that prayer is more effective than good deeds, for no one was greater in good deeds than Moses, and yet God let Moses see the land only after Moses prayed.

 

Thus one can interpret  to say that Moses asked to see God's House. Rabbi Simeon ben Yohai explained that the altar was called "Lebanon" because it made white (malbin) the sins of Israel, as indicated by the words of  "though your sins be as scarlet, they shall be as white (yalbinu) as snow; though they be red like crimson, they shall be as wool." Rabbi Tabyomi said that the altar was called "Lebanon" because all hearts (lebabot) rejoice there, as indicated by the words of  "Fair in situation, the joy of the whole earth, even Mount Zion." And the Rabbis said that the altar was called "Lebanon" because of the words of 1 Kings , which says of God and the Temple: "My eyes and My heart (libbi) shall be there perpetually.

Another Midrash employed the understanding of "Lebanon" as the Temple to explain the role of gold in the world. Rabbi Simeon ben Lakish taught that the world did not deserve to have the use of gold. But God created gold for the sake of the Temple.

The Gemara provided another explanation of the word "enough! (rav)" in  God was telling Moses that Moses had a master (rav), namely Joshua, waiting to assume authority to lead the Israelites into the Promised Land, and thus Moses should not delay another master's reign by prolonging his own. The Gemara provided a third explanation of the word "enough!": God was telling Moses not to petition him anymore, so that people should not say: "How severe is the Master, and how persistent is the student." The Gemara explained why God was so hard on Moses with a Baraita taught in the School of Rabbi Ishmael: according to the camel is the burden; that is, a stronger, more righteous one must bear a greater burden.

The School of Rabbi Ishmael taught that whenever Scripture uses the word "command" (tzav) (as  does), it denotes exhortation to obedience immediately and for all time.

Deuteronomy chapter 4
In , Moses calls on Israel to heed the "statutes" (hukim) and "ordinances" (mishpatim). The Rabbis in a Baraita taught that the "ordinances" (mishpatim) were commandments that logic would have dictated that we follow even had Scripture not commanded them, like the laws concerning idolatry, adultery, bloodshed, robbery, and blasphemy. So that people do not think these "ordinances" (mishpatim) to be empty acts, which speaks of the "statutes" (hukim) and "ordinances" (mishpatim), says "I am the Lord," indicating that the Lord made these statutes, and we have no right to question them.

The Gemara cited  as an instance of where the Torah alludes to life after death. The Gemara related that sectarians asked Rabban Gamaliel where Scripture says that God will resurrect the dead. Rabban Gamaliel answered them from the Torah, the Prophets (Nevi'im), and the Writings (Ketuvim), yet the sectarians did not accept his proofs. From the Torah, Rabban Gamaliel cited , "And the Lord said to Moses, ‘Behold, you shall sleep with your fathers and rise up [again].'" But the sectarians replied that perhaps  reads, "and the people will rise up." From the Prophets, Rabban Gamaliel cited , "Your dead men shall live, together with my dead body shall they arise. Awake and sing, you who dwell in the dust: for your dew is as the dew of herbs, and the earth shall cast out its dead." From the Writings, Rabban Gamaliel cited Song of Songs , "And the roof of your mouth, like the best wine of my beloved, that goes down sweetly, causing the lips of those who are asleep to speak." (As the Rabbis interpreted Song of Songs as a dialogue between God and Israel, they understood  to refer to the dead, whom God will cause to speak again.) But the sectarians rejoined that perhaps  means merely that the lips of the departed will move. For Rabbi Johanan said that if a halachah (legal ruling) is said in any person's name in this world, the person's lips speak in the grave, as  says, "causing the lips of those that are asleep to speak." Thus Rabban Gamaliel did not satisfy the sectarians until he quoted , "which the Lord swore to your fathers to give to them." Rabban Gamaliel noted that God swore to give the land not "to you" (the Israelites whom Moses addressed) but "to them" (the Patriarchs, who had long since died). And (the superfluous use of "this day" implies that) just as you are all alive today, so shall you all live again in the World To Come.

The Midrash noted that at the creation of the world, the Euphrates was not designated "great." But it is called "great" because it encompasses the Land of Israel, which  calls a "great nation." As a popular saying said, the king's servant is a king, and thus Scripture calls the Euphrates great because of its association with the great nation of Israel.

Bar Kappara compared the soul and the Torah to a lamp, as  says, "The soul of man is the lamp of the Lord," and  says, "For the commandment is a lamp, and the teaching is light." God told humanity that God's light — the Torah — is in their hands, and their light — their souls — are in God's hands. God said that if people guard God's light, then God will guard their lights, but if people extinguish God's light, then God will extinguish their lights. For  says, "Only take heed to yourself," and then "Keep your soul diligently." This explains , "For if you shall diligently keep." The Midrash thus taught that "if you keep" (God's commandments), then "you shall be kept" (and your souls shall be guarded).

A Baraita deduced from the words "you shall make them known to your children, and your children's children" in  that if a parent teaches a child Torah, Scripture ascribes merit as though the parent had taught the child, the child's children, and so on, until the end of all time. Rabbi Joshua ben Levi taught that if a parent teaches a child (or some say a grandchild) Torah, Scripture accounts it as if the parent had received the Torah at Mount Sinai, as  says, "And you shall make them known to your children and your children's children," and immediately thereafter,  says, "The day that you stood before the Lord your God in Horeb." Rabbi Hiyya bar Abba once found Rabbi Joshua ben Levi, who had hurriedly thrown a cloth upon his head, taking his child (or some say grandchild) to the synagogue to study. When Rabbi Hiyya asked Rabbi Joshua what was going on, Rabbi Joshua replied that it was no small thing that the words "you shall make them known to your children and your children's children" are immediately followed by the words "The day that you stood before the Lord your God in Horeb." From then on, Rabbi Hiyya bar Abba did not eat breakfast before revising the previous day's lesson with his child (or some say grandchild) and adding another verse. And Rabbah son of Rav Huna did not eat breakfast until he took his child (or some say grandchild) to school.

The "ladder" symbolizes Mount Sinai. That the ladder is "set upon (mutzav) the earth" recalls , which says, "And they stood (vayityatzvu) at the nether part of the mount." "And behold the angels of God" alludes to Moses and Aaron. "Ascending" parallels  "And Moses went up to God." "And descending" parallels  "And Moses went down from the mount." And the words "and, behold, the Lord stood beside him" in  parallel the words of  "And the Lord came down upon Mount Sinai."

Rabbi Johanan counted ten instances in which Scripture refers to the death of Moses (including one in the parashah), teaching that God did not finally seal the harsh decree until God declared it to Moses. Rabbi Johanan cited these ten references to the death of Moses: (1)  "But I must die in this land; I shall not cross the Jordan"; (2)  "The Lord said to Moses: ‘Behold, your days approach that you must die'"; (3)  "[E]ven now, while I am still alive in your midst, you have been defiant toward the Lord; and how much more after my death"; (4)  "For I know that after my death, you will act wickedly and turn away from the path that I enjoined upon you"; (5)  "And die in the mount that you are about to ascend, and shall be gathered to your kin, as your brother Aaron died on Mount Hor and was gathered to his kin"; (6)  "This is the blessing with which Moses, the man of God, bade the Israelites farewell before his death"; (7)  "So Moses the servant of the Lord died there in the land of Moab, at the command of the Lord"; (8)  "Moses was 120 years old when he died"; (9)  "Now it came to pass after the death of Moses"; and (10)  "Moses My servant is dead." Rabbi Johanan taught that ten times it was decreed that Moses should not enter the Land of Israel, but the harsh decree was not finally sealed until God revealed it to him and declared (as reported in ): "It is My decree that you should not pass over."

And one may investigate from one end of heaven to the other, but one should not investigate what was before this world. Similarly, the Rabbis in a Baraita interpreted  to forbid inquiry into the work of creation in the presence of two people, reading the words "for ask now of the days past" to indicate that one may inquire, but not two. The Rabbis reasoned that the words "since the day that God created man upon the earth" in  taught that one must not inquire concerning the time before creation. The Rabbis reasoned that the words "the days past that were before you" in  taught that one may inquire about the six days of creation. The Rabbis further reasoned that the words "from the one end of heaven to the other" in  taught that one must not inquire about what is beyond the universe, what is above and what is below, what is before and what is after.

But as soon as Adam sinned, God placed God's hand upon Adam and diminished him, as  says: "You have fashioned me after and before, and laid Your hand upon me." (And Rav Judah in the name of Rav also taught that as soon as Adam sinned, God placed God's hand upon Adam and diminished him.) The Gemara reconciled the interpretations of Rabbi Eleazar and Rav Judah in the name of Rav by concluding that the distance from the earth to the firmament must equal the distance from one end of heaven to the other.

Rabbi Levi addressed the question that  raises: "Did ever a people hear the voice of God speaking out of the midst of the fire, as you have heard, and live?" Rabbi Levi taught that the world would not have been able to survive hearing the voice of God in God's power, but instead, as  says, "The voice of the Lord is with power." That is, the voice of God came according to the power of each individual — young, old, or infant — to receive it.

Rabbi Johanan taught that sorcerers are called , kashefim, because they seek to contradict the power of Heaven. Rabbi Hanina interpreted  to teach that even sorcerers have no power to oppose God's will. A woman once tried to take earth from under Rabbi Hanina's feet (so as to perform sorcery against him). Rabbi Hanina told her that if she could succeed in her attempts, she should go ahead, but (he was not concerned, for)  says, "There is none else beside Him." But the Gemara asked whether Rabbi Johanan had not taught that sorcerers are called , kashefim, because they (actually) contradict the power of Heaven. The Gemara answered that Rabbi Hanina was in a different category, owing to his abundant merit (and therefore Heaven protected him).

The Mishnah taught that those who killed in error went into banishment. One would go into banishment if, for example, while one was pushing a roller on a roof, the roller slipped over, fell, and killed someone. One would go into banishment if while one was lowering a cask, it fell down and killed someone. One would go into banishment if while coming down a ladder, one fell and killed someone. But one would not go into banishment if while pulling up the roller it fell back and killed someone, or while raising a bucket the rope snapped and the falling bucket killed someone, or while going up a ladder one fell down and killed someone. The Mishnah's general principle was that whenever the death occurred in the course of a downward movement, the culpable person went into banishment, but if the death did not occur in the course of a downward movement, the person did not go into banishment. If while chopping wood, the iron slipped from the ax handle and killed someone, Rabbi taught that the person did not go into banishment, but the sages said that the person did go into banishment. If from the split log rebounding killed someone, Rabbi said that the person went into banishment, but the sages said that the person did not go into banishment.

Rabbi Jose bar Judah taught that to begin with, they sent a slayer to a city of refuge, whether the slayer killed intentionally or not. Then the court sent and brought the slayer back from the city of refuge. The Court executed whomever the court found guilty of a capital crime, and the court acquitted whomever the court found not guilty of a capital crime. The court restored to the city of refuge whomever the court found liable to banishment, as  ordained, "And the congregation shall restore him to the city of refuge from where he had fled."  also says, "The manslayer . . . shall dwell therein until the death of the high priest, who was anointed with the holy oil," but the Mishnah taught that the death of a high priest who had been anointed with the holy anointing oil, the death of a high priest who had been consecrated by the many vestments, or the death of a high priest who had retired from his office each equally made possible the return of the slayer. Rabbi Judah said that the death of a priest who had been anointed for war also permitted the return of the slayer. Because of these laws, mothers of high priests would provide food and clothing for the slayers in cities of refuge so that the slayers might not pray for the high priest's death. If the high priest died at the conclusion of the slayer's trial, the slayer did not go into banishment. If, however, the high priests died before the trial was concluded and another high priest was appointed in his stead and then the trial concluded, the slayer returned home after the new high priest's death.

The Pirke De-Rabbi Eliezer told that when Abraham left Ur of the Chaldees, all the magnates of the kingdom gave him gifts, and Nimrod gave Abraham Nimrod’s first-born son Eliezer as a perpetual slave. After Eliezer had dealt kindly with Isaac by securing Rebekah to be Isaac’s wife, he set Eliezer free, and God gave Eliezer his reward in this world by raising him up to become a king — Og, king of Bashan.

Deuteronomy chapter 5
Rabbi Azariah in the name of Rabbi Judah ben Rabbi Simon taught that the familiarity with which God spoke with the Israelites in  befit the infancy of Israel's nationhood. Rabbi Azariah in the name of Rabbi Judah ben Rabbi Simon explained in a parable. A mortal king had a daughter whom he loved exceedingly. So long as his daughter was small, he would speak with her in public or in the courtyard. When she grew up and reached puberty, the king determined that it no longer befit his daughter's dignity for him to converse with her in public. So he directed that a pavilion be made for her so that he could speak with his daughter inside the pavilion. In the same way, when God saw the Israelites in Egypt, they were in the childhood of their nationhood, as  says, "When Israel was a child, then I loved him, and out of Egypt I called My son." When God saw the Israelites at Sinai, God spoke with them as  says, "The Lord spoke with you face to face." As soon as they received the Torah, became God's nation, and said (as reported in ), "All that the Lord has spoken will we do, and obey," God observed that it was no longer in keeping with the dignity of God's children that God should converse with them in the open. So God instructed the Israelites to make a Tabernacle, and when God needed to communicate with the Israelites, God did so from the Tabernacle. And thus  bears this out when it says, "And when Moses went into the tent of meeting that He might speak with him."

Reading , “And God spoke all these words, saying,” the Mekhilta of Rabbi Ishmael taught that God spoke the ten commandments in one utterance, in a manner of speech of which human beings are incapable.

The Mishnah taught that the priests recited the Ten Commandments daily. The Gemara, however, taught that although the Sages wanted to recite the Ten Commandments along with the Shema in precincts outside of the Temple, they soon abolished their recitation, because the Sages did not want to lend credence to the arguments of the heretics (who might argue that Jews honored only the Ten Commandments).

And a Midrash compared "I am the Lord your God" to a princess who having been taken captive by robbers, was rescued by a king, who subsequently asked her to marry him. Replying to his proposal, she asked what dowry the king would give her, to which the king replied that it was enough that he had rescued her from the robbers. (So God's delivery of the Israelites from Egypt was enough reason for the Israelites to obey God's commandments.)

Rabbi Simlai expounded that a total of 613 commandments were communicated to Moses — 365 negative commandments, corresponding to the number of days in the solar year, and 248 positive commandments, corresponding to the number of the parts in the human body. The letters of the word "Torah" have a numerical value of 611 (as  equals 400,  equals 6,  equals 200, and  equals 5). And the Gemara did not count among the commandments that the Israelites heard from Moses the commandments, "I am the Lord your God," and, "You shall have no other gods before Me," as the Israelites heard those commandments directly from God.

Rabbi Ishmael taught that Scripture speaks in particular of idolatry, for  says, "Because he has despised the word of the Lord." You shall have no other gods before Me."

The Sifre taught that to commit idolatry is to deny the entire Torah.

Rav Ada bar Ahabah taught that the Torah thus obligates women to sanctify the Sabbath (by reciting or hearing the Kiddush, even though women are generally not bound to observe such positive precepts that depend on specified times). For Scripture says both "Remember" and "Observe," and all who are included in the exhortation "Observe" are included in the exhortation "Remember." And women, since they are included in "Observe" (which the Rabbis interpret as a negative commandment that binds all Jews), are also included in "Remember."

The Gemara reports that on the eve of the Sabbath before sunset, Rabbi Simeon ben Yochai and his son saw an old man running with two bundles of myrtle and asked him what they were for. The old man explained that they were to bring a sweet smell to his house in honor of the Sabbath. Rabbi Simeon ben Yochai asked whether one bundle would not be enough. Rabbi Simeon ben Yochai told his son to mark how precious the commandments are to Israel.

A Midrash deduced from similarities in the language of the creation of humanity and the Sabbath commandment that God gave Adam the precept of the Sabbath.

A Midrash asked to which commandment  refers when it says, "For if you shall diligently keep all this commandment that I command you, to do it, to love the Lord your God, to walk in all His ways, and to cleave to Him, then will the Lord drive out all these nations from before you, and you shall dispossess nations greater and mightier than yourselves." Rabbi Levi said that "this commandment" refers to the recitation of the Shema, but the Rabbis said that it refers to the Sabbath, which is equal to all the precepts of the Torah.

The Alphabet of Rabbi Akiva taught that when God was giving Israel the Torah, God told them that if they accepted the Torah and observed God's commandments, then God would give them for eternity a most precious thing that God possessed — the World To Come. When Israel asked to see in this world an example of the World To Come, God replied that the Sabbath is an example of the World To Come.

Similarly, the Midrash quoted , in which Job said, "The stranger did not lodge in the street" (that is, none were denied hospitality), to show that God disqualifies no creature, but receives all; the city gates were open all the time and anyone could enter them. Thus the Midrash taught that these verses reflect the Divine example of accepting all creatures.

The Mishnah taught that both men and women are obligated to carry out all commandments concerning their fathers. Rav Judah interpreted the Mishnah to mean that both men and women are bound to perform all precepts concerning a father that are incumbent upon a son to perform for his father.

A Midrash noted that almost everywhere, Scripture mentions a father's honor before the mother's honor. But  mentions the mother first to teach that one should honor both parents equally.

To "revere" means that the child must neither stand nor sit in the parent's place, nor contradict the parent's words, nor engage in a dispute to which the parent is a party. To "honor" means that the child must give the parent food and drink and clothes, and take the parent in and out.

Rabbi Tarfon taught that God came from Mount Sinai (or others say Mount Seir) and was revealed to the children of Esau, as  says, "The Lord came from Sinai, and rose from Seir to them," and "Seir" means the children of Esau, as  says, "And Esau dwelt in Mount Seir." God asked them whether they would accept the Torah, and they asked what was written in it. From there, God turned and was revealed to the children of Ishmael, as  says, "He shined forth from Mount Paran," and "Paran" means the children of Ishmael, as  says of Ishmael, "And he dwelt in the wilderness of Paran." God asked them whether they would accept the Torah, and they asked what was written in it. From there, God sent messengers to all the nations of the world asking them whether they would accept the Torah, and they asked what was written in it. They replied that they had no delight in the Torah, therefore let God give it to God's people, as  says, "The Lord will give strength [identified with the Torah] to His people; the Lord will bless His people with peace." From there, God returned and was revealed to the children of Israel, as  says, "And he came from the ten thousands of holy ones," and the expression "ten thousands" means the children of Israel, as  says, "And when it rested, he said, ‘Return, O Lord, to the ten thousands of the thousands of Israel.’" With God were thousands of chariots and 20,000 angels, and God’s right hand held the Torah, as  says, "At his right hand was a fiery law to them."

The Mishnah taught that one who intended to kill an animal but killed a person instead was not liable for murder. One was not liable for murder who intended to kill an unviable fetus and killed a viable child. One was not liable for murder who intended to strike the victim on the loins, where the blow was insufficient to kill, but struck the heart instead, where it was sufficient to kill, and the victim died. One was not liable for murder who intended to strike the victim on the heart, where it was enough to kill, but struck the victim on the loins, where it was not, and yet the victim died.

If, however, you transgress the commandment, then (in God's words in ) "I will draw out the sword after you."

But the Mekhilta noted that  says, "You shall not covet the silver or the gold that is on them, nor take it for yourself." And the Mekhilta reasoned that just as in  the word "covet" applies only to prohibit the carrying out of one's desire into practice, so also  (20:14 in NJSP) prohibits only the carrying out of one's desire into practice.

The Mekhilta of Rabbi Simeon taught that the differing terms mean that one can incur liability for desiring in and of itself and for coveting in and of itself.

Rabbi Isaac read  to teach that the prophets received from the Revelation at Sinai all the messages that they were to prophesy to subsequent generations. For  does not say, "who are not here standing with us this day," but just "who are not with us this day." Rabbi Isaac taught that  thus refers to the souls that were to be created thereafter; because these souls did not yet have any substance in them, they could not yet be "standing" at Sinai. But although these souls did not yet exist, they still received their share of the Torah that day.

Rabbi Tanchum ben Chanilai found in God's calling to Moses alone in  proof that a burden that is too heavy for 600,000 — hearing the voice of God (see  (5:22 in NJPS)) — can be light for one.

The Gemara cited  (5:27–28 in NJPS) to support the proposition that God approved of the decision of Moses to abstain from marital relations so as to remain pure for his communication with God. A Baraita taught that Moses did three things of his own understanding, and God approved: (1) He added one day of abstinence of his own understanding; (2) he separated himself from his wife (entirely, after the Revelation); and (3) he broke the Tables (on which God had written the Ten Commandments). The Gemara explained that to reach his decision to separate himself from his wife, Moses applied an a fortiori (kal va-chomer) argument to himself. Moses reasoned that if he heard from the Shechinah at all times and not only at one appointed time, how much more so should he abstain from marital contact.

And just as  says, “The Lord is righteous,” we, too, should be righteous.

Deuteronomy chapter 6
Once when Rami bar Ezekiel visited Bnei Brak, he saw goats grazing under fig trees while honey was flowing from the figs, and milk dripped from the goats mingling with the fig honey, causing him to remark that it was indeed a land flowing with milk and honey. Rabbi Jacob ben Dostai said that it is about three miles from Lod to Ono, and once he rose up early in the morning and waded all that way up to his ankles in fig honey. Resh Lakish said that he saw the flow of the milk and honey of Sepphoris extend over an area of sixteen miles by sixteen miles. Rabbah bar Bar Hana said that he saw the flow of the milk and honey in all the Land of Israel and the total area was equal to an area of twenty-two parasangs by six parasangs.

Rav once told Rabbi Hiyya that he had not witnessed Rabbi Judah the Prince accept upon himself the yoke of the Heaven by reciting the Shema. Rabbi Hiyya replied to Rav that in the moment that Rabbi Judah the Prince passed his hand to cover his eyes to recite, "Hear, O Israel, the Lord our God, the Lord is One," he accepted upon himself the yoke of the kingdom of Heaven.

," VeHaya im Shamoa . . .) so that one first accepts the yoke of Heaven by proclaiming the Unity of God and then accepts the yoke of the commandments by saying the words, "If you shall diligently heed all My commandments." ," VaYomer . . .) because  is applicable both in the day and the night (since it mentions all the commandments), whereas  is applicable only in the day (since it mentions only the precept of fringes, tzitzit, which is not obligatory by night).

The Mishnah taught that the absence of one of the two portions of scripture in the mezuzah —  and  — invalidates the other, and indeed even one imperfect letter can invalidates the whole.

Reading , "Hear, O Israel, the Lord our God, the Lord is One," the Rabbis taught that God told Israel that all that God had created, God created in pairs: heaven and earth, sun and moon, Adam and Eve, this world and the World To Come. But God's Glory is One and Unique in the world.

Rabbi Isaac compared this to a king who entered a province with his generals, officials, and governors. Some of the citizens of the province chose a general as their patron, others an official, and others a governor. But the one who was cleverer than the rest chose the king as his patron, as all the other officials were liable to be changed, but the king would remain the king. Likewise, when God came down on Sinai, there also came down with God many companies of angels, Michael and his company, and Gabriel and his company.

Rabbi Eleazar ben Azariah read , "Hear, O Israel: the Lord our God, the Lord is One," to indicate that Israel has made God the sole object of Israel's love in the world. God, in turn, makes Israel the special object of God's love in the world, as 2 Samuel  and 1 Chronicles  say, "And who is like Your people, like Israel, a nation one in the earth."

That verse reports, "And Jacob called to his sons, and said: ‘Gather yourselves together, that I may tell you what will befall you in the end of days.'" According to Rabbi Simeon, Jacob wished to reveal to his sons what would happen in the end of the days, but just then, the Shechinah departed from him. So Jacob said that perhaps, Heaven forefend, he had fathered a son who was unworthy to hear the prophecy, just as Abraham had fathered Ishmael or Isaac had fathered Esau. But his sons answered him (in the words of ), "Hear O Israel, the Lord our God, the Lord is One," explaining that just as there was only One in Jacob's heart, so there was only One in their hearts. And Jacob replied, "Blessed be the name of God's glorious Kingdom for ever and ever." The Rabbis considered that Jews might not recite those words at all, but rejected that option, as Jacob did say the words. So the Rabbis ruled that Jews should recite the words quietly. Rabbi Isaac taught that the School of Rabbi Ammi said that one can compare this practice to that of a princess who smelled a spicy pudding. If she revealed her desire for the pudding, she would suffer disgrace; but if she concealed her desire, she would suffer deprivation. So her servants brought her pudding secretly. Rabbi Abbahu taught that the Sages ruled that Jews should recite the words aloud, so as not to allow heretics to claim that Jews were adding improper words to the Shema. But in Nehardea, where there were no heretics so far, they recited the words quietly.

I am the Lord your God," and the Israelites all answered with the words of  "The Lord our God, the Lord is One." And Moses said, "Blessed be the name of His glorious kingdom for ever and ever."

The Rabbis told that when Moses ascended to heaven, he heard the ministering angels saying to God, "Blessed be the name of His glorious kingdom for ever and ever." Moses brought this declaration down to Israel. Rav Assi explained why Jews do not make this declaration aloud, comparing this to a man who took jewelry from the royal palace and gave it to his wife, telling her not to wear it in public, but only in the house. But on the Day of Atonement, when Jews are as pure as the ministering angels, they do recite the declaration aloud.

Rabbi Johanan considered twice daily recitation of the Shema to fulfill the commandment of  that "this book of the law shall not depart out of your mouth, but you shall meditate therein day and night." Rabbi Jose taught that even if they took the old bread of display away in the morning and placed the new bread on the table only in the evening, they had honored the commandment to set the bread "continually." Rabbi Ammi analogized from this teaching of Rabbi Jose that people who learn only one chapter of Torah in the morning and one chapter in the evening have nonetheless fulfilled the precept of  that "this book of the law shall not depart out of your mouth, but you shall meditate therein day and night." Rabbi Johanan taught that it is forbidden, however, to teach this to people who through ignorance are careless in the observance of the laws (as it might deter them from further Torah study). But Rava taught that it is meritorious to say it in their presence (as they might think that if merely reciting the Shema twice daily earns reward, how great would the reward be for devoting more time to Torah study).

A Midrash warned that if one changed the Hebrew letter dalet in the word , echad ("one") in  into the letter resh (changing the word from "one" to "strange") one could cause the destruction of the Universe.

A Midrash interpreted , "My beloved is like a gazelle or a young hart; behold, he stands behind our wall," to apply to God's Presence in the synagogue. The Midrash read the words, "behold, He stands behind our wall," to allude to the occasion in  when God came to visit Abraham on the third day after Abraham's circumcision.  says, "And the Lord appeared to him by the terebinths of Mamre, as he sat (yoshev) . . . ." The word for "he sat" is in a form that can be read yashav, the letter vav being omitted, as though it read that Abraham was sitting before he saw God, but on seeing God, he wanted to stand up. But God told him to sit, as Abraham would serve as a symbol for his children, for when his children would come into their synagogues and houses of study and recite the Shema, they would be sitting down and God's Glory would stand by. To support this reading, the Midrash cited , "God stands in the congregation of God."

A Midrash taught that when Jews rise from their sleep and quickly proceed to read the Shema, thus proclaiming the sovereignty of God, they become like lions. Then as they set out on their worldly affairs, if they stumble over any sin, or if destroying demons approach them, they proclaim the sovereignty of God. By virtue of reading the Shema, Jews are supported by angelic watchers of the day and entrusted to the watchers of the night. When, on awakening, they again proclaim the sovereignty of God, the watchers of the night hand them over to the watchers of the day, as  can be read to say, "My soul is entrusted to the Lord; from the time of the watchers of the morning to that of the watchers of the following morning."

A Midrash taught that great is peace, for the world could not be maintained except by peace, and the Torah is wholly peace, as  says, "Her ways are ways of pleasantness, and all her paths are peace." The reading of the Shema concludes (in the Evening, Maariv, Prayer Service) with the words: "He spreads the tabernacle of peace over His people." The Amidah prayer concludes with peace. And the Priestly Blessing concludes with peace. Rabbi Simeon ben Halafta observed that there is no vessel that holds a blessing save peace, as  says, "The Lord will give strength to His people; the Lord will bless His people with peace."

A Midrash asked to which commandment  refers when it says, "For if you shall diligently keep all this commandment that I command you, to do it, to love the Lord your God, to walk in all His ways, and to cleave to Him, then will the Lord drive out all these nations from before you, and you shall dispossess nations greater and mightier than yourselves." Rabbi Levi said that "this commandment" refers to the recitation of the Shema, but the Rabbis said that it refers to the Sabbath, which is equal to all the precepts of the Torah.

Alternatively, "with all your might (me'odeka)" means that one should love God whatever "measure" (middah, a play on me'odeka) God metes out.

The Rabbis taught that once the Roman government forbade Jews to study the Torah. Pappus ben Judah found Rabbi Akiva publicly gathering people to study Torah and asked Akiva whether he did not fear the government. Akiva replied with a parable: A fox was once walking alongside of a river, and he saw fish swimming from one place to another. The fox asked the fish from what they fled. The fish replied that they fled from the nets cast by men. The fox invited the fish to come up onto the dry land, so that they could live together as the fox's ancestors had lived with the fish's ancestors. The fish replied that for an animal described as the cleverest of animals, the fox was rather foolish. For if the fish were afraid in the element in which they live, how much more would they fear in the element in which they would die. Akiva said that it was the same with Jews. If such was the Jews’ condition when they sat and studied Torah, of which  says, "that is your life and the length of your days," how much worse off would Jews be if they neglected the Torah! Soon afterwards, the Romans arrested and imprisoned Rabbi Akiva, and the Romans arrested Pappus ben Judah and imprisoned him next to Rabbi Akiva. Rabbi Akiva asked Pappus who had brought him there. Pappus replied that Rabbi Akiva was happy that he had been seized for occupying himself with the Torah. Pappus regretted that he had been seized for occupying himself with idle things. When the Romans took Rabbi Akiva out for execution, it was the hour for the recital of the Shema, and while they combed his flesh with iron combs, he was accepting upon himself the kingship of Heaven by reciting  ("Here, O Israel . . . ," Shema Yisrael . . .). His disciples asked him whether his devotion extended even to that point. Rabbi Akiva questioned when he would have the opportunity to fulfill this. Now that he had the opportunity, he asked his disciples, should he not fulfill it? He prolonged the word "One" (ehad) in  until he expired while saying it. A Heavenly voice went forth and proclaimed: Happy are you, Akiva, that your soul has departed with the word "One"! The ministering angels asked God: Such devotion to Torah, and such a reward? God replied to the angels (in the continuation of ), "Their portion is in life," and a Heavenly voice proclaimed that Rabbi Akiva was destined for the life of the World to Come.

Rabbi Johanan said in the name of Rabbi Simeon ben Jehozadak that it was resolved by a majority vote in the upper chambers of the house of Nithza in Lydda that in every other law of the Torah, if a person is forced to choose between transgressing the commandment and death, he may transgress and not die, excepting idolatry, incest (including adultery), and murder. The Gemara questioned whether that would mean that one could practice idolatry to avoid being killed. Rabbi Ishmael taught that if a person is forced to choose between idolatry and death, the person should do so, and not be killed, for  says, "You shall therefore keep my statutes and my judgments, which if a man does, he shall live in them" — not die by them. The Gemara questioned whether one might think that idolatry may even be practiced openly,  says, "Neither shall you profane My Holy Name; but I will be hallowed," and as the public violation of commandments profanes God's Name, one might think that one must die to avoid doing so. The Sages ruled with Rabbi Eliezer, who cited  "And you shall love the Lord your God with all your heart and with all your soul, and with all your might." Rabbi Eliezer taught that since  says, "with all your soul," there must be a reason that  also says, "with all your might [that is, worldly resources]," and vice versa. stated? Rabbi Eliezer taught that  says, "with all your soul" for the person to whom life is more precious than wealth, and  says, "with all your soul" to teach that one must be prepared even to give one's life in God's service; while to one to whom wealth is more precious than life  says, "with all your might" (that is, wealth).

So that if people see that those who study Torah and Mishnah are honest in business and speak pleasantly, then they will accord honor to the Name of God. But if people see that those who study Torah and Mishnah are dishonest in business and discourteous, then they will associate their shortcomings with their being Torah scholars.

A Midrash catalogued the wide range of additional capabilities of the heart reported in the Hebrew Bible. The heart speaks, sees, hears, walks, falls, stands, rejoices, cries, is comforted, is troubled, becomes hardened, grows faint, grieves, fears, can be broken, becomes proud, rebels, invents, cavils, overflows, devises, desires, goes astray, lusts, is refreshed, can be stolen, is humbled, is enticed, errs, trembles, is awakened, hates, envies, is searched, is rent, meditates, is like a fire, is like a stone, turns in repentance, becomes hot, dies, melts, is susceptible to fear, gives thanks, covets, becomes hard, makes merry, acts deceitfully, speaks from out of itself, loves bribes, writes words, plans, receives commandments, acts with pride, makes arrangements, and aggrandizes itself.

Discussions of the laws of tefillin in  appear at Mishnah Menachot 3:7 and Babylonian Talmud Zevachim 37b, Sanhedrin 4b, and Menachot 34b–37b.

Discussions of the laws of the mezuzah in  appear at Babylonian Talmud Menachot 31b–34b.

In , God announced that God would "put the plague of leprosy in a house of the land of your possession." Rabbi Hiyya asked: Was it then a piece of good news that plagues were to come upon them? Rabbi Simeon ben Yohai answered that when the Canaanites heard that the Israelites were approaching, they hid their valuables in their houses. So God brought plagues upon a house of one of the Israelites so that when he would pull it down, he would find a treasure.

Noting that  commands, "The Lord your God you shall fear and you shall serve," and  commands, "You shall fear your father and mother," the Rabbis taught in a Baraita that Scripture likens the fear of parents to the fear of God. As  (20:12 in NJSP) commands, "Honor your father and your mother," and  directs, "Honor the Lord with your substance," Scripture likens the honor due to parents to that due to God. And as  commands, "He that curses his father or his mother shall surely be put to death," and  commands, "Whoever curses his God shall bear his sin," Scripture likens cursing parents to cursing God. But the Baraita conceded that with respect to striking (which  addresses with regard to parents), that it is certainly impossible (with respect to God). The Baraita concluded that these comparisons between parents and God are only logical, since the three (God, the mother, and the father) are partners in creation of the child. For the Rabbis taught in a Baraita that there are three partners in the creation of a person — God, the father, and the mother. When one honors one's father and mother, God considers it as if God had dwelt among them and they had honored God. And a Tanna taught before Rav Nachman that when one vexes one's father and mother, God considers it right not to dwell among them, for had God dwelt among them, they would have vexed God.

The wise child asks, in the words of  “What mean the testimonies, and the statutes, and the ordinances, that the Lord our God has commanded you?” The Mekhilta taught that we explain to this child all the laws of Passover. The simple child asks, in the words of  “What is this?” The Mekhilta taught that we respond simply with the words of  “By strength of hand the Lord brought us out from Egypt, from the house of bondage.” The wicked child asks, in the words of  “What do you mean by this service?” The Mekhilta taught that because wicked children exclude themselves, we should also exclude this child in answering and say, in the words of  “It is because of what the Lord did for me when I came forth out of Egypt” — for me but not for you; had you been there, you would not have been saved. As for the child who does not know how to ask, the Mekhilta taught that we take the initiative, as  says (without having reported that the child asked), “You shall tell your child on that day.”

Deuteronomy chapter 7

In medieval Jewish interpretation
The parashah is discussed in these medieval Jewish sources:

Deuteronomy chapter 4
Reading , "Observe therefore and do them, for this is your wisdom and understanding in the sight of the nations that, when they hear all these statutes, they shall say: 'Surely this great nation is a wise and understanding people,'" Baḥya ibn Paquda taught that it is one's duty to study created things and to deduce from them the wisdom of the Creator.

Baḥya taught that by saying "take good heed," Moses was warning people in their minds and thoughts to not represent God in any form or to conceive God in the likeness of any thing or any comparison, since the Israelites’ eyes never perceived any form or likeness when God spoke to them.

Baḥya ibn Paquda argued that the greatest benefit that God bestowed on humanity and the strongest proof of God's existence is the Torah that God gave humanity and God's manifestation of God's presence, as  says, "Unto you it was shown, that you may know that the Lord, He is God; there is none else beside Him. Out of Heaven He made you to hear His voice, that He might instruct you; and upon earth He made you to see His great fire; and you did hear His words out of the midst of the fire."

Baḥya taught that one should exert one's mind until one knows God through the evidences of God's works but not strive to know God in God's glorious essence. For God is close to humanity from the perspective of God's deeds but infinitely remote in any representation of God's essence or comparison with it; one can never find God in that way.

Deuteronomy chapter 5

Baḥya reasoned that the closer the murdered is to the murderer, the more the punishment should be severe, and thus the punishment for those who kill themselves will undoubtedly be very great. Baḥya taught that for that reason, people should not recklessly endanger their lives.

Citing  (5:18 in NJPS), Baḥya ibn Paquda taught that not to covet is a leading example of an negative duty of the heart.

Maimonides taught that the violation of this commandment was not punished by lashes, because it does not involve a deed. Maimonides taught that a person does not violate  (20:14 in NJSP) until the person actually takes the article that the person covets, as reflected by  "Do not covet the gold and silver on these statues and take it for yourself." Maimonides taught that a person who desires a home, a spouse, utensil, or anything else belonging to a colleague that the person can acquire violates a negative commandment when the person thinks in the person's heart how it might be possible to acquire this thing from the colleague. Maimonides read  (5:18 in NJPS), "Do not desire," to refer even to feelings in the heart alone. Thus, a person who desires another person's property violates one negative commandment. A person who purchases an object the person desires after pressuring the owners and repeatedly asking them, violates two negative commandments. And if the person takes the article by robbery, the person violates three negative commandments.

Abrabanel deduced that  (20:14 in NJSP) mentions the things that might be coveted in the order that a person has need of them, and what it behooves a person to try to acquire in this world. Therefore, the first coveted item mentioned is a person's house, then the person's spouse, then the person's servants, and lastly the person's animals that do not speak. (5:18 in NJPS), however, mentions them in the order of the gravity of the sin and evil. The most evil coveting is that of another person's spouse, as in David's coveting of Bathsheba. Next in magnitude of evil comes coveting the house in which one's neighbor lives, lest the person evict the neighbor and take the neighbor's home. Next comes the neighbor's field, for although a person does not live there as in the house, it is the source of the neighbor's livelihood and inheritance, as in the affair of Ahab and the vineyard of Naboth the Jezreelite. After the field  (5:18 in NJPS) mentions servants, who Abrabanel valued of lesser importance than one's field. Next come the neighbor's animals, who do not have the faculty of speech, and lastly, to include the neighbor's inanimate moveable property,  (5:18 in NJPS) says "and anything that is your neighbor's."

Deuteronomy chapter 6
Baḥya ibn Paquda argued that  encompasses 10 matters, corresponding to the Ten Commandments. Five of these matters concern the spiritual (mind/heart): (1) That the Creator exists. (2) God is our God. (3) God is the true Unity. (4) That we love God with all our heart. (5) That we serve God wholeheartedly. And five of these matters concern the physical (the body): (1) You shall teach them to your children. (2) You shall speak in them. (3) You shall bind them as a sign on your hand. (4) They shall be as frontlet between your eyes. (5) You shall write them upon the doorposts of your house and upon your gates. Citing , Baḥya taught that love for God is a leading example of an affirmative duty of the heart. By keeping these words continually on one's lips, they will always be in one's consciousness, and one's thoughts will never be empty of God.

The words "with all your soul" in  imply: even if it takes one's soul.

Naḥmanides read , "Do what is right and good in the sight of the Eternal," to reflect the intent that whereas previously, Moses stated that one is to keep the particular statutes that God commanded, here Moses is saying that even where God has not commanded, one should give thought to doing what is good and right in God's eyes, for God loves the good and the right. Naḥmanides considered this is a great principle, for it was impossible for the Torah to mention all aspects of people's conduct with their neighbors and friends, and all their various transactions, and the ordinances of all societies and countries. But since God mentioned many of them, Moses here stated in a general way that, in all matters, one should do what is good and right, including even compromise and going beyond the requirements of the law. Thus, Naḥmanides taught, people should seek to refine their behavior in every form of activity, until they are worthy of being called "good and upright."

Deuteronomy chapter 7
Baḥya ibn Paquda taught that whenever God singles out a person for special favor, that person is under an obligation of increased service as an expression of gratitude for that favor. And secondly, that this should not be God's reward for their service, at the expense of their reward in the World To Come, as the Sages explained , "And repays them that hate Him to their face (during this life) to destroy them (in the hereafter)."

In modern interpretation
The parashah is discussed in these modern sources:

Deuteronomy chapter 4
Nowhere does Scripture say: "Believe, O Israel, and you will be blessed; do not doubt, O Israel, or this or that punishment will befall you." Thus Mendelssohn concluded that Scripture does not command faith, but accepts no other commands than those that come by way of conviction. Its propositions are presented to the understanding, submitted for consideration, without being forced upon our belief. Belief and doubt, assent and opposition, in Mendelssohn's view, are not determined by desire, wishes, longings, fear, or hope, but by knowledge of truth and untruth. Hence, Mendelssohn concluded, ancient Judaism has no articles of faith.

Explaining the origins of the law that one can see in the Cities of Refuge, Justice Oliver Wendell Holmes Jr. wrote that early forms of legal procedure were grounded in vengeance. Roman law and German law started from the blood feud, which led to the composition, at first optional, then compulsory, by which the feud was bought off. Holmes reported that in Anglo-Saxon practice, the feud was pretty well broken up by the time of William the Conqueror. The killings and house-burnings of an earlier day became the appeals of mayhem and arson, and then the legal actions now familiar to lawyers.

Deuteronomy chapter 5
In 1980, in the case of Stone v. Graham, the Supreme Court of the United States held unconstitutional a Kentucky statute that required posting the Ten Commandments on the wall of each public classroom in the state. Thus the Court concluded that the pre-eminent purpose for posting the Ten Commandments on schoolroom walls was plainly religious.

In 1950, the Committee on Jewish Law and Standards of Conservative Judaism ruled: “Refraining from the use of a motor vehicle is an important aid in the maintenance of the Sabbath spirit of repose. Such restraint aids, moreover, in keeping the members of the family together on the Sabbath. However where a family resides beyond reasonable walking distance from the synagogue, the use of a motor vehicle for the purpose of synagogue attendance shall in no wise be construed as a violation of the Sabbath but, on the contrary, such attendance shall be deemed an expression of loyalty to our faith. . . . [I]n the spirit of a living and developing Halachah responsive to the changing needs of our people, we declare it to be permitted to use electric lights on the Sabbath for the purpose of enhancing the enjoyment of the Sabbath, or reducing personal discomfort in the performance of a mitzvah.”

Deuteronomy chapter 6
MacDonald wrote that the term for milk (chalav) could easily be the word for "fat" (chelev), and the word for honey (devash) could indicate not bees' honey but a sweet syrup made from fruit. The expression evoked a general sense of the bounty of the land and suggested an ecological richness exhibited in a number of ways, not just with milk and honey. MacDonald noted that the expression was always used to describe a land that the people of Israel had not yet experienced, and thus characterized it as always a future expectation.

In the Hebrew, after the opening "Hear, O Israel," the affirmation itself states tersely: "Eternal our God Eternal echad." Plaut wrote that the text can be understood to say:
 is our God, and  alone;
 is our God, one indivisible ;
 our God is a unique ;
 is our God,  is unique (in extraordinariness).

The early 20th century Oxford professor Samuel Rolles Driver taught that  sets out the fundamental truth of Israel's religion, the uniqueness and unity of God, and the fundamental duty founded upon it of the devotion to God of the Israelite's entire being. Reading , Driver asked in what sense the word "One" is to be understood: Does it express the Unity of God, declaring that God is in God's essence indivisible, and cannot — like Ba'al and Ashtoret, for instance, who are often spoken of in the plural — assume different phases or attributes, as presiding over different localities, or different departments of nature, and cannot further be united syncretistically with other deities; but is only known under the one character by which God has revealed God's Self to Israel? Or does the word "One" denote the Uniqueness of God, representing God in a unique sense, as the God with whom no other god can be compared, as the only Deity to whom the true attributes of the Godhead really belong? Driver taught that the first interpretation, however, is not excluded by the second, for the unity of God is almost a necessary corollary of God's Uniqueness. Driver concluded that  is thus a great declaration of Monotheism in the sense both that there is only one God, and also that the God who exists is truly One. Driver taught that the truth is one which in its full significance was only gradually brought home to the Israelites and was hardly explicitly enunciated much before the age of Deuteronomy and Jeremiah. Driver argued that it was only gradually seen distinctly, and taught explicitly, not only that God is unique among "other gods," but that "other gods" have no real existence whatever beside God.

Baruch Spinoza listed the proposition in  that God is One second among the doctrines of universal faith and the fundamental dogmas of Scripture that tend to the central doctrine that there exists a God, a Supreme Being, Who loves justice and charity, and Who must be obeyed by whoever would be saved, and that the worship of God consists in the practice of justice and love towards one's neighbor. Spinoza argued that no one could dispute that the doctrine that God is One is absolutely necessary for entire devotion, admiration, and love towards God, for devotion, admiration, and love spring from the superiority of one over all else.

Gerald Janzen, Professor Emeritus of Old Testament at Christian Theological Seminary, grouped interpretations of the word , echad, in  into two sorts: a word that says something about God (for example, "One" or "Unique") or a word that says something about God's claim on Israel (for example, "alone"). Concluding that one should read the word as "One," Jansen argued that the claim upon Israel to love God with all its heart and soul and strength in  follows upon an affirmation that God is "One," and this affirmation is to identify in God the dependable ground upon which an exhortation to wholehearted loyalty may appropriately be made.

Interpreting , John Wesley wrote that "Sinners, especially presumptuous sinners, are said to tempt God, that is, to make a trial of God, whether he be so wise as to see their sins, [or] so just and true and powerful as to take vengeance on them, concerning which they are very apt to doubt because of the present impunity and prosperity of many such persons."

Commandments

According to Maimonides
Maimonides cited verses in the parashah for 11 positive and 15 negative commandments:
That warriors shall not fear their enemies nor be frightened of them in battle
To know that there exists God
Not to entertain the thought that there is any god but the Lord
Not to make a graven image, neither to make oneself nor to have made for oneself by others
Not to bow down to an object of idolatry, even if that is not its normal way of worship
Not to worship an object of idolatry in its normal ways of worship
Not to take an oath in vain
Not to do work on the Sabbath
To honor one's father and mother
Not to kill an innocent person
Not to kidnap any person of Israel; this is theft of a person.
Not to covet
 
Not to desire."
To acknowledge God's Oneness
To love God
To read the Shema twice daily
To learn Torah and teach it
To bind tefillin on the head
To bind tefillin on the arm
To fasten a mezuzah
To fear God
To swear by God's Name
Not to test the word of God
Not to make a covenant with the seven Canaanite nations
Not to have mercy on idolaters
Not to intermarry with idolaters

According to Sefer ha-Chinuch
According to Sefer ha-Chinuch, there are 8 positive and 4 negative commandments in the parashah.
Not to desire another's possession
To know that God is one
To love God
To study Torah
To say the Shema twice daily
To bind tefillin on the arm
To wear tefillin on the head
To put a mezuzah on each door post
Not to test the prophet unduly
Not to make a covenant with idolaters
Not to show favor to them
Not to marry idolaters

In the liturgy
The Torah reader and the congregation recite  immediately before the Torah reading, signifying how learning the Torah embodies remaining steadfast to God.

It is customary for listeners to stand while the reader chants the Ten Commandments in the synagogue, as if the listeners were themselves receiving the revelation at Sinai.

The verses of the Shema and V'ahavta in  constitute a central prayer in Jewish prayer services. A shorter version of the Shema, composed of simply , appears in the Torah service (Seder K'riat HaTorah) and the Kedushah of the Musaf service for Shabbat. And the Shema and for some the V'ahavta, are among the first prayers said upon arising and form the central prayer of the bedtime Shema, said just before retiring for sleep.

The "love" of God that  urges finds reflection in the characterization of God as the "Beloved" in the Lekhah Dodi liturgical poem of the Kabbalat Shabbat prayer service.

And shortly thereafter, the Haggadah quotes  to provide the question of the wise son, also in the magid section.

Also in the magid section, the Haggadah quotes  — emphasizing the word "us" (otanu) — for the proposition that God did not redeem the ancestral Israelites alone, but also the current generation of Jews with them.

The Weekly Maqam
In the Weekly Maqam, Sephardi Jews each week base the songs of the services on the content of that week's parashah. For Parashah Va'etchanan, Sephardi Jews apply Maqam Hoseni, the maqam that expresses beauty, because this is the parashah where Moses repeats to the Israelites their history of receiving the Ten Commandments.

Haftarah
The parashah is always read on the special Sabbath Shabbat Nachamu, the Sabbath immediately after Tisha B'Av. Shabbat Nachamu ("Sabbath of comfort") takes its name from the first word of the haftarah for the parashah, which speaks of "comforting" the Jewish people for their suffering — , nachamu nachamu, ami, "Be comforted, be comforted, My nation...." The haftarah is the first in the cycle of seven haftarot of consolation after Tisha B'Av, leading up to Rosh Hashanah.

Summary
God told the prophet to comfort God's people and bid Jerusalem to take heart, as the city's guilt had been paid off. A voice in the wilderness called to clear the way and make a highway for God, for every valley will be lifted up, every mountain will be made low, and God's glory will be revealed to all. A voice proclaimed that all flesh is grass, its goodness like a flower of the field, which withers and fades; but God's word will stand forever. The herald of good tidings should go to the mountain and announce to the cities of Judah that God will come as a Mighty One to rule, as a shepherd that feeds the flock, gathers the lambs, carries them, and gently leads them.

Who has held the waters in hand, measured the heavens, comprehended the earth, and weighed mountains in the balance? Who has counseled or instructed God? Nations are like a drop in a bucket, like dust in the balance, as nothing before God. Can one compare God to anything, to an idol that a woodworker carved? God sits above the earth, and its inhabitants are like grasshoppers. God brings princes to nothing, makes the judges of the earth like nothing; scarcely are they planted, but God blows upon them, and they wither and blow away.

To whom then to liken God? Lift up your eyes and see: The One who created the stars, called them by name, by the greatness of God's might and strong power each one appears.

Connection to the Special Sabbath
The haftarah answers laments read on Tisha B'Av from the book of Lamentations.  and 9 complain that Jerusalem "has none to comfort her," "she has no comforter." In , the haftarah answers, "Comfort, comfort My people, says your God."  complains that "the ways of Zion mourn." In , the haftarah answers, "Clear in the wilderness the way of the Lord, make plain in the desert a highway for our God."  complains that Zion's princes "are gone without strength before the pursuer." In  and 26, the haftarah answers, "lift up your voice with strength," God "is strong in power."  hoped for Jerusalem that "the punishment of your iniquity is accomplished" and God "will no more carry you away into captivity." In , the haftarah affirms, "Bid Jerusalem take heart, and proclaim to her, that her time of service is accomplished, that her guilt is paid off."

As well, the haftarah echoes the parashah.

Notes

Further reading
The parashah has parallels or is discussed in these sources:

Ancient
Instructions of Shuruppak. Sumer, early 3rd millennium BCE. In, e.g., Bendt Alster. Wisdom of Ancient Sumer, pages 60–69. Capital Decisions Ltd, 2005. (analog to Ten Commandments).
Code of Hammurabi Epilogue reverse 25, lines 60–73. Babylonia, Circa 1780 BCE. In, e.g., James B. Pritchard. Ancient Near Eastern Texts Relating to the Old Testament, page 178. Princeton: Princeton University Press, 1969. (not to change the law).
Book of the Dead, chapter 125. Ancient Egypt, 1500–1400 BCE. In, e.g., E. A. Wallis Budge. The Egyptian Book of the Dead (The Papyrus of Ani) Egyptian Text, Transliteration and Translation, pages 195–205. New York: Dover Publications, 1967. (analog to Ten Commandments).

Biblical
 (firstborn);  (firstborn); ; 20:5 in NJPS (punishing children for fathers' sin);  (Ten Commandments);  (cities of refuge);  (firstborn);  (punishing children for fathers' sin).
 (firstborn);  (punishing children for fathers' sin);  (firstborn); .
 (worshipping sun, moon, stars); ;  (no capital punishment of children for fathers' sin).
 (cities of refuge).
 (keeping the Sabbath);  (universally observed Sabbath).
 (sun worship);  (not punishing children for fathers' sin);  (the just one does not rob).
 (value of God's law);  (God's righteousness reaches to heaven);  (none like God among the gods);  (heavens praise God in the assembly of the holy ones);  (fear of the Lord is the beginning of wisdom).
 (worshipping sun, moon).

Early nonrabbinic
Galatians  Circa 50–60 CE. (God is one.)
Mark  Circa 70 CE. (Shema).
Matthew  Circa 70–100 CE. (Shema).
Luke  Circa 80–150 CE. (Shema).
Josephus, Antiquities of the Jews 4:8:2, 13  Circa 93–94. In, e.g., The Works of Josephus: Complete and Unabridged, New Updated Edition. Translated by William Whiston. Peabody, Massachusetts: Hendrickson Publishers, 1987.

Classical rabbinic
Mishnah: Berakhot 1:1–3:6; 9:5; Orlah 1:7; Shabbat 1:1–24:5; Sotah 7:1, 8; Kiddushin 1:7; Bava Kamma 5:7; Sanhedrin 2:4; 9:1–6; Makkot 2:1–8; Avodah Zarah 1:1–5:12; Avot 3:8; Zevachim 8:10; Menachot 3:7; Tamid 5:1. Land of Israel, circa 200 CE. In, e.g., The Mishnah: A New Translation. Translated by Jacob Neusner, pages 3–14, 160, 179–208, 457, 459, 488, 515, 586, 602–04, 612–16, 660–72, 679, 717, 739–40, 869. New Haven: Yale University Press, 1988.
Tosefta: Berakhot 1:1–3:1, 6:1; Maaser Sheni 5:28; Shekalim 2:2; Rosh Hashanah 2:13; Chagigah 2:7; Sotah 7:7, 17, 8:10; Bava Kamma 6:18, 7:9; Sanhedrin 4:7; Makkot 2:1–3:10; Avodah Zarah 1:16, 3:15; Zevachim 8:23. Land of Israel, circa 250 CE. In, e.g., The Tosefta: Translated from the Hebrew, with a New Introduction. Translated by Jacob Neusner. Peabody, Massachusetts: Hendrickson Publishers, 2002.
Sifre to Deuteronomy 26:1–36:4. Land of Israel, circa 250–350 CE. In, e.g., Sifre to Deuteronomy: An Analytical Translation. Translated by Jacob Neusner, volume 1, pages 67–104. Atlanta: Scholars Press, 1987.
Jerusalem Talmud: Berakhot 1a–42b, 53a, 54a, 72b, 86b–88a, 92b, 93b; Peah 6b–7a; Sheviit 46b; Terumot 7a; Shabbat 1a–113b; Pesachim 84b; Yoma 5b, 9a; Rosh Hashanah 9b; Taanit 3a, 28b; Megillah 8a, 14a, 15b, 22a, 25a, 33b; Chagigah 1b, 10b–11a; Yevamot 12a; Nedarim 15a; Sotah 28a, 31b, 37a, 40a; Gittin 44b; Kiddushin 19b–20a, 21a–b; Makkot chapter 2; Avodah Zarah 1a–. Tiberias, Land of Israel, circa 400 CE. In, e.g., Talmud Yerushalmi. Edited by Chaim Malinowitz, Yisroel Simcha Schorr, and Mordechai Marcus, volumes 1–3, 6b–7, 13–15, 19, 21, 24–27, 29, 33, 36–37, 39–40. Brooklyn: Mesorah Publications, 2005–2017. And In, e.g., The Jerusalem Talmud: A Translation and Commentary. Edited by Jacob Neusner and translated by Jacob Neusner, Tzvee Zahavy, B. Barry Levy, and Edward Goldman. Peabody, Massachusetts: Hendrickson Publishers, 2009.
Genesis Rabbah 1:10; 7:2; 8:1, 9; 15:1; 16:2–3, 5; 20:7; 21:1, 3, 5, 9; 24:2; 38:6; 39:11; 44:9, 20, 23; 55:3; 68:12; 84:15. Land of Israel, 5th century. In, e.g., Midrash Rabbah: Genesis. Translated by Harry Freedman and Maurice Simon, volume 1, pages 9, 50–51, 54–55, 60, 119, 125–27, 130, 166, 172, 174–75, 178, 199, 304–05, 319, 374–75, 377, 483–84; volume 2, pages 625, 739–40, 808, 893, 912, 1002. London: Soncino Press, 1939.

Babylonian Talmud: Berakhot 2a–6a, 30b, 32a–b, 48b, 54a, 61b; Shabbat 9b, 10b, 32b, 33b, 51b, 56b, 75a, 78b, 79b, 87a–b, 103b, 132a; Eruvin 13a, 22a, 48a, 92b, 95b; Pesachim 22b, 25a, 55a, 56a; Yoma 10a, 11a, 19b, 33b, 72b, 82a, 86a; Sukkah 3a–b, 10b, 25a–b, 41b–42a, 53b; Beitzah 5a; Rosh Hashanah 18a–b, 27a, 28b, 32b; Taanit 9a; Megillah 9a–b, 11a, 17b, 20a, 21a, 24b, 31b; Moed Katan 7b, 15a–b, 18b, 21b; Chagigah 3a, 9b, 11b–12a; Yevamot 6b, 17a, 23a, 48b, 49b, 62a, 76a, 78b, 105a, 109b; Ketubot 111b; Nedarim 8a, 37a, 38a, 62b; Sotah 5a, 10b, 13b, 31a, 32b, 49a; Gittin 12a, 45b, 56b, 57b, 88a; Kiddushin 29a–30b, 34a, 39b–40a, 57a, 58a, 68b; Bava Kamma 41b, 54b–55a, 67b, 79b, 87a, 92b, 102b; Bava Metzia 16b, 35a, 89a, 108a; Bava Batra 110a; Sanhedrin 4b, 17a, 21b–22a, 29a, 38a–b, 56a–57a, 59b, 64a, 67b, 74a, 78b–79a; Makkot 7a–13a, 23b–24a; Shevuot 20b, 36a; Avodah Zarah 2b–3a, 4b–5a, 7b, 11a, 20a, 23b, 25a, 36b, 45b, 54b, 58b; Zevachim 19a, 37b, 80a; Menachot 28a, 31b–37b, 42b, 43b–44a, 53b, 71a, 99b; Chullin 7b, 17a, 23a, 89a, 91b, 119b, 141a, 142a; Bekhorot 29a, 57a; Arakhin 3b; Temurah 3b–4a, 28b; Tamid 32b. Babylonia, 6th century. In, e.g., Talmud Bavli. Edited by Yisroel Simcha Schorr, Chaim Malinowitz, and Mordechai Marcus, 72 volumes. Brooklyn: Mesorah Pubs., 2006.
Midrash Proverbs, chapters 6, 8, 11, 14, 23. 8th century. In, e.g., The Midrash on Proverbs. Translated with an introduction and annotations by Burton L. Visotzky, pages 38, 47, 59, 64, 73, 76, 101, 129, 131, 141. New Haven: Yale University Press, 1992.
Deuteronomy Rabbah 2:1–37. Land of Israel, 9th century. In, e.g., Midrash Rabbah: Deuteronomy. Translated by Harry Freedman and Maurice Simon. London: Soncino Press, 1939.

Medieval
Solomon ibn Gabirol. A Crown for the King, 2 ("You are one"). Spain, 11th century. Translated by David R. Slavitt, pages 4–6. New York: Oxford University Press, 1998.
Rashi. Commentary. Deuteronomy 3–7. Troyes, France, late 11th century. In, e.g., Rashi. The Torah: With Rashi's Commentary Translated, Annotated, and Elucidated. Translated and annotated by Yisrael Isser Zvi Herczeg, volume 5, pages 45–81. Brooklyn: Mesorah Publications, 1997.
Rashbam. Commentary on the Torah. Troyes, early 12th century. In, e.g., Rashbam’s Commentary on Deuteronomy: An Annotated Translation. Edited and translated by Martin I. Lockshin, pages 49–68. Providence, Rhode Island: Brown Judaic Studies, 2004.

Judah Halevi. Kuzari. 1:87–91; 2:34, 50; 3:31, 35, 39–41; 4:3; 5:23 Toledo, Spain, 1130–1140. In, e.g., Jehuda Halevi. Kuzari: An Argument for the Faith of Israel. Introduction by Henry Slonimsky, pages 21, 60–63, 108, 114, 165, 168, 172–73, 205, 293. New York: Schocken, 1964.
Numbers Rabbah 12:4; 23:13. 12th century. In, e.g., Midrash Rabbah: Numbers, volume 5, pages 463–64; volume 6, pages 876–80. Translated by Judah J. Slotki. London: Soncino Press, 1939.
Abraham ibn Ezra. Commentary on the Torah. Mid-12th century. In, e.g., Ibn Ezra's Commentary on the Pentateuch: Deuteronomy (Devarim). Translated and annotated by H. Norman Strickman and Arthur M. Silver, volume 5, pages 19–54. New York: Menorah Publishing Company, 2001.
Maimonides. The Guide for the Perplexed, Introduction; part 1, chapters 3, 18, 30, 36–37, 39, 42–43; part 2, chapters 5, 11, 30–31, 33, 39; part 3, chapters 9, 26–27, 29, 31–33, 39, 41, 48, 51–53. Cairo, Egypt, 1190. In, e.g., Moses Maimonides. The Guide for the Perplexed. Translated by Michael Friedländer, pages 3, 16–17, 28, 40, 50–51, 53–55, 57, 159, 168, 213, 219, 221–22, 231–32, 265, 310, 313, 320–21, 323, 325, 327, 339, 341, 345, 379, 386–87, 392–93. New York: Dover Publications, 1956.
Hezekiah ben Manoah. Hizkuni. France, circa 1240. In, e.g., Chizkiyahu ben Manoach. Chizkuni: Torah Commentary. Translated and annotated by Eliyahu Munk, volume 4, pages 1061–82. Jerusalem: Ktav Publishers, 2013.
Nachmanides. Commentary on the Torah. Jerusalem, circa 1270. In, e.g., Ramban (Nachmanides): Commentary on the Torah: Deuteronomy. Translated by Charles B. Chavel, volume 5, pages 46–93. New York: Shilo Publishing House, 1976.

Zohar 3:260a–270a. Spain, late 13th century. In, e.g., The Zohar. Translated by Harry Sperling and Maurice Simon. 5 volumes. London: Soncino Press, 1934.
Bahya ben Asher. Commentary on the Torah. Spain, early 14th century. In, e.g., Midrash Rabbeinu Bachya: Torah Commentary by Rabbi Bachya ben Asher. Translated and annotated by Eliyahu Munk, volume 7, pages 2374–444. Jerusalem: Lambda Publishers, 2003.
Meister Eckhart. "Sermon 2 (LW XXIX): ‘God is one'"; "Sermon 3 (XL, 3): ‘What do you think of Christ? Whose son is he?'" Early 14th Century. In, e.g., Meister Eckhart. Selected Writings. Translated by Oliver Davies, pages 258–64. London: Penguin Books, 1994..
Isaac ben Moses Arama. Akedat Yizhak (The Binding of Isaac). Late 15th century. In, e.g., Yitzchak Arama. Akeydat Yitzchak: Commentary of Rabbi Yitzchak Arama on the Torah. Translated and condensed by Eliyahu Munk, volume 2, pages 801–21. New York, Lambda Publishers, 2001.

Modern
Isaac Abravanel. Commentary on the Torah. Italy, between 1492 and 1509. In, e.g., Abarbanel: Selected Commentaries on the Torah: Volume 5: Devarim/Deuteronomy. Translated and annotated by Israel Lazar, pages 24–44. Brooklyn: CreateSpace, 2015.

Obadiah ben Jacob Sforno. Commentary on the Torah. Venice, 1567. In, e.g., Sforno: Commentary on the Torah. Translation and explanatory notes by Raphael Pelcovitz, pages 846–69. Brooklyn: Mesorah Publications, 1997.
Moshe Alshich. Commentary on the Torah. Safed, circa 1593. In, e.g., Moshe Alshich. Midrash of Rabbi Moshe Alshich on the Torah. Translated and annotated by Eliyahu Munk, volume 3, pages 960–92. New York, Lambda Publishers, 2000.
Saul Levi Morteira. "Do Not Add to His Words." Amsterdam, circa 1630. In Marc Saperstein. Exile in Amsterdam: Saul Levi Morteira’s Sermons to a Congregation of "New Jews," pages 408–29. Cincinnati: Hebrew Union College Press, 2005.

Avraham Yehoshua Heschel. Commentaries on the Torah. Cracow, Poland, mid 17th century. Compiled as Chanukat HaTorah. Edited by Chanoch Henoch Erzohn. Piotrkow, Poland, 1900. In Avraham Yehoshua Heschel. Chanukas HaTorah: Mystical Insights of Rav Avraham Yehoshua Heschel on Chumash. Translated by Avraham Peretz Friedman, pages 297–303. Southfield, Michigan: Targum Press/Feldheim Publishers, 2004.
Thomas Hobbes. Leviathan, 3:42; 4:45. England, 1651. Reprint edited by C. B. Macpherson, pages 545–47, 672, 676. Harmondsworth, England: Penguin Classics, 1982.
Chaim ibn Attar. Ohr ha-Chaim. Venice, 1742. In Chayim ben Attar. Or Hachayim: Commentary on the Torah. Translated by Eliyahu Munk, volume 5, pages 1775–817. Brooklyn: Lambda Publishers, 1999.
Moses Mendelssohn. Sefer Netivot Hashalom (The "Bi’ur," The Explanation). Berlin, 1780–1783. In Moses Mendelssohn: Writings on Judaism, Christianity, and the Bible. Edited Michah Gottlieb, pages 226–28. Waltham, Massachusetts: Brandeis University Press, 2011.
Moses Mendelssohn. Jerusalem, § 2. Berlin, 1783. In Jerusalem: Or on Religious Power and Judaism. Translated by Allan Arkush; introduction and commentary by Alexander Altmann, pages 100, 119. Hanover, New Hampshire: Brandeis University Press, 1983.

Samson Raphael Hirsch. Horeb: A Philosophy of Jewish Laws and Observances. Translated by Isidore Grunfeld, pages 5–8, 12–13, 18–35, 43–46, 61–78, 102–09, 117–21, 175–80, 187–89, 217–22, 274, 298–302, 359–66, 369–74, 378–81, 406–16, 441–43, 448–52, 478, 514, 544, 565–68. London: Soncino Press, 1962. Reprinted 2002. Originally published as Horeb, Versuche über Jissroel's Pflichten in der Zerstreuung. Germany, 1837.
Samson Raphael Hirsch. The Jewish Sabbath. Nabu Press, 2010. Originally published Germany, 19th Century.

Emily Dickinson. Poem 112 (Where bells no more affright the morn —). Circa 1859. Poem 168 (If the foolish, call them "flowers" —). Circa 1860. Poem 564 (My period had come for Prayer —). Circa 1862. Poem 597 (It always felt to me — a wrong). Circa 1862. Poem 1260 (Because that you are going). Circa 1873. Poem 1591 (The Bobolink is gone —). Circa 1883. Poem 1719 (God is indeed a jealous God —). 19th century. Poem 1733 (No man saw awe, nor to his house). 19th century. In The Complete Poems of Emily Dickinson. Edited by Thomas H. Johnson, pages 53, 79–80, 274–75, 293–94, 551–52, 659, 698, 703. New York: Little, Brown & Co., 1960.
David Clarkson. "Soul Idolatry Excludes Men from Heaven." In The Practical Works of David Clarkson, Volume II, pages 299ff. Edinburgh: James Nichol, 1865. In David Clarkson. Soul Idolatry Excludes Men Out of Heaven. Curiosmith, 2010.

Samuel David Luzzatto (Shadal). Commentary on the Torah. Padua, 1871. In, e.g., Samuel David Luzzatto. Torah Commentary. Translated and annotated by Eliyahu Munk, volume 4, pages 1160–73. New York: Lambda Publishers, 2012.
Samson Raphael Hirsch. The Jewish Sabbath. Frankfurt, before 1889. Translated by Ben Josephussoro. 1911. Reprinted Lexington, Kentucky: CreateSpace Independent Publishing Platform, 2014.
G. Campbell Morgan. The Ten Commandments. Chicago: Fleming H. Revell Company, 1901. Reprinted BiblioLife, 2009.

Yehudah Aryeh Leib Alter. Sefat Emet. Góra Kalwaria (Ger), Poland, before 1906. Excerpted in The Language of Truth: The Torah Commentary of Sefat Emet. Translated and interpreted by Arthur Green, pages 289–93. Philadelphia: Jewish Publication Society, 1998. Reprinted 2012.
Hermann Cohen. Religion of Reason: Out of the Sources of Judaism. Translated with an introduction by Simon Kaplan; introductory essays by Leo Strauss, pages 74–79, 90, 156, 159, 163, 169, 220. New York: Ungar, 1972. Reprinted Atlanta: Scholars Press, 1995. Originally published as Religion der Vernunft aus den Quellen des Judentums. Leipzig: Gustav Fock, 1919.

Kaufmann Kohler. "Shema Yisroel: Origin and Purpose of its Daily Recital." Journal of Jewish Lore and Philosophy, volume 1 (number 3/4) (July/October 1919): pages 255–64.

Harold H. Rowley. Moses and the Decalogue. George H. Doran Co., 1919.
Abraham Isaac Kook. The Moral Principles. Early 20th century. In Abraham Isaac Kook: the Lights of Penitence, the Moral Principles, Lights of Holiness, Essays, Letters, and Poems. Translated by Ben Zion Bokser, pages 156, 176. Mahwah, N.J.: Paulist Press 1978.
Alexander Alan Steinbach. Sabbath Queen: Fifty-four Bible Talks to the Young Based on Each Portion of the Pentateuch, pages 142–45. New York: Behrman's Jewish Book House, 1936.
Joseph Reider. The Holy Scriptures: Deuteronomy with Commentary, pages 44–84. Philadelphia: Jewish Publication Society, 1937.

Thomas Mann. Joseph and His Brothers. Translated by John E. Woods, pages 325, 447, 612, 788. New York: Alfred A. Knopf, 2005. Originally published as Joseph und seine Brüder. Stockholm: Bermann-Fischer Verlag, 1943.
Thomas Mann, Rebecca West, Franz Werfel, John Erskine, Bruno Frank, Jules Romains, André Maurois, Sigrid Undset, Hendrik Willem van Loon, Louis Bromfield, Herman Rauchning. The Ten Commandments: Ten Short Novels of Hitler's War Against the Moral Code. Edited by Armin L. Robinson. New York: Simon and Schuster, 1943.
The Sabbath Anthology. Edited by Abraham E. Millgram. Philadelphia: The Jewish Publication Society, 1944; reprinted 2018..
Morris Adler, Jacob B. Agus, and Theodore Friedman. “Responsum on the Sabbath.” Proceedings of the Rabbinical Assembly, volume 14 (1950), pages 112–88. New York: Rabbinical Assembly of America, 1951. In Proceedings of the Committee on Jewish Law and Standards of the Conservative Movement 1927–1970, volume 3 (Responsa), pages 1109–34. Jerusalem: The Rabbinical Assembly and The Institute of Applied Hallakhah, 1997.

Abraham Joshua Heschel. The Sabbath. New York: Farrar, Straus and Giroux, 1951. Reprinted 2005.
Abraham Joshua Heschel. Man's Quest for God: Studies in Prayer and Symbolism, pages 36, 120. New York: Charles Scribner's Sons, 1954.
Morris Adler. The World of the Talmud, pages 26, 28–29, 76, 89–90. B'nai B'rith Hillel Foundations, 1958. Reprinted Kessinger Publishing, 2007.
Johann J. Stamm and Maurice E. Andrew. The Ten Commandments in Recent Research. Naperville, Illinois: Alec R. Allenson, 1967.

Martin Buber. On the Bible: Eighteen studies, pages 80–121. New York: Schocken Books, 1968.
Anthony Phillips. Ancient Israel's Criminal Law: A New Approach to the Decalogue. Oxford: Basil Blackwell, 1970.
Eduard Nielsen. The Ten Commandments in New Perspective. Alec R. Allenson, 1968. Reprinted by Hymns Ancient & Modern Ltd, 2012.
Anthony Phillips. Ancient Israel's Criminal Law: A New Approach to the Decalogue. Basil Blackwell, 1970.

Hermann Cohen. Religion of Reason: Out of the Sources of Judaism, page 76. New York: F. Ungar Publishing Company, 1972.
W. Gunther Plaut. Shabbat Manual. New York: CCAR, 1972.
Michael Breslow. "The Shema." Mississippi Review, volume 2 (number 2) (1973): pages 60–65.
Harry M. Buck. “Worship, Idolatry, and God.” In A Light unto My Path: Old Testament Studies in Honor of Jacob M. Myers. Edited by Howard N. Bream, Ralph D. Heim, and Carey A. Moore, pages 67–82. Philadelphia: Temple University Press, 1974.
Peter C. Craigie. The Problem of War in the Old Testament, pages 47, 55, 57. Grand Rapids, Michigan: William B. Eerdmans Publishing Company, 1978.
Walter J. Harrelson. The Ten Commandments and Human Rights. Philadelphia: Fortress Press, 1980. Revised edition Mercer Univ. Press, 1997.
Nehama Leibowitz. Studies in Devarim: Deuteronomy, pages 44–84. Jerusalem: The World Zionist Organization, 1980.
Patrick D. Miller. "The Most Important Word: The Yoke of the Kingdom". Iliff Review. (1984): pages 17–29.
J. Gerald Janzen. "On the Most Important Word in the Shema (Deuteronomy VI 4–5)." Vetus Testamentum, volume 37 (number 3) (July 1987): pages 280–300.
Pinchas H. Peli. Torah Today: A Renewed Encounter with Scripture, pages 205–08. Washington, D.C.: B'nai B'rith Books, 1987.
Jerry W. Lee. "The Shema." Biblical Illustrator (winter 1988): pages 70–72.
Patrick D. Miller Jr. "The Many Faces of Moses: A Deuteronomic portrait." Bible Review, volume 4 (number 5) (October 1988).
David Noel Freedman. "The Nine Commandments: The secret progress of Israel's sins." Bible Review, volume 5 (number 6) (December 1989).
J. Gerald Janzen. "An Echo of the Shema in Isaiah 51:1–3". Journal for the Study of the Old Testament, volume 13 (number 43) (1989): pages 69–82.
Krzysztof Kieślowski. The Decalogue. Warsaw: Sender Freies Berlin (SFB), Telewizja Polska (TVP), and Zespol Filmowy "Tor," 1989.
Tzvee Zahavy. "Political and Social Dimensions in the Formation of Early Jewish Prayer: The Case of the Shema." Proceedings of the World Congress of Jewish Studies, volume 1 (1989): pages 33–40.
Patrick D. Miller. Deuteronomy, pages 42–110. Louisville: John Knox Press, 1990.
Mark S. Smith. The Early History of God: Yahweh and the Other Deities in Ancient Israel, pages 23, 80, 101, 113, 125, 151, 166. New York: HarperSanFrancisco, 1990.
Sidnie Ann White. "The All Souls Deuteronomy and the Decalogue." Journal of Biblical Literature, volume 109 (number 2) (Summer 1990): pages 193–206.
Pinchas Hacohen Peli. The Jewish Sabbath: A Renewed Encounter. New York: Schocken, 1991.
Philip D. Stern. The Biblical Herem: A Window on Israel's Religious Experience. Atlanta: Scholars Press, 1991.
Moshe Weinfeld. Deuteronomy 1–11, volume 5, pages 189–384. New York: Anchor Bible, 1991.
Moshe Weinfeld. "What Makes the Ten Commandments Different?" Bible Review, volume 7 (number 2) (April 1991).
Moshe Halbertal and Avishai Margalit. Idolatry. Translated by Naomi Goldblum. Cambridge, Massachusetts: Harvard University Press, 1992.
Lawrence Kushner. God Was in This Place and I, I Did Not Know: Finding Self, Spirituality and Ultimate Meaning, pages 39–40. Jewish Lights Publishing, 1993. (between God and you).
A Song of Power and the Power of Song: Essays on the Book of Deuteronomy. Edited by Duane L. Christensen. Winona Lake, Indiana: Eisenbrauns, 1993.
Aaron Wildavsky. Assimilation versus Separation: Joseph the Administrator and the Politics of Religion in Biblical Israel, page 3. New Brunswick, New Jersey: Transaction Publishers, 1993.
Stephen A. Geller. "Fiery Wisdom: Logos and Lexis in Deuteronomy 4." Prooftexts, volume 14 (number 2) (May 1994): pages 103–39.
Sandy Eisenberg Sasso. "In God's Name". Woodstock, Vermont: Jewish Lights Publishing, 1994. (calling God One).
Ronald Youngblood. "Counting the Ten Commandments." Bible Review, volume 10 (number 6) (December 1994).
Judith S. Antonelli. "The Prohibition of Imagery." In In the Image of God: A Feminist Commentary on the Torah, pages 407–15. Northvale, New Jersey: Jason Aronson, 1995.
Ellen Frankel. The Five Books of Miriam: A Woman’s Commentary on the Torah, pages 251–57. New York: G. P. Putnam's Sons, 1996.
Jack R. Lundbom. "The Inclusio and Other Framing Devices in Deuteronomy I–XXVIII." Vetus Testamentum, volume 46 (number 3) (July 1996): pages 296–315.
W. Gunther Plaut. The Haftarah Commentary, pages 439–50. New York: UAHC Press, 1996.
Mark Dov Shapiro. Gates of Shabbat: A Guide for Observing Shabbat. New York: CCAR Press, 1996.
Moshe Weinfeld. "Deuteronomy's Theological Revolution." Bible Review, volume 12 (number 1) (February 1996).
Jeffrey H. Tigay. The JPS Torah Commentary: Deuteronomy: The Traditional Hebrew Text with the New JPS Translation, pages 38–88, 432–44. Philadelphia: Jewish Publication Society, 1996.
Robert Goodman. “Shabbat.” In Teaching Jewish Holidays: History, Values, and Activities, pages 1–19. Denver: A.R.E. Publishing, 1997.
Sorel Goldberg Loeb and Barbara Binder Kadden. Teaching Torah: A Treasury of Insights and Activities, pages 299–303. Denver: A.R.E. Publishing, 1997.
Baruch J. Schwartz. "What Really Happened at Mount Sinai? Four biblical answers to one question." Bible Review, volume 13 (number 5) (October 1997).
J. Gerald Janzen. "The Claim of the Shema". Encounter, volume 59 (number 1–2) (1998): pages 243–57.
William H.C. Propp. "Why Moses Could Not Enter The Promised Land." Bible Review, volume 14 (number 3) (June 1998).
Susan Freeman. Teaching Jewish Virtues: Sacred Sources and Arts Activities, pages 6–7, 39–54, 179–94, 255–68. Springfield, New Jersey: A.R.E. Publishing, 1999. (6–9).
R. Walter L. Moberly. "Toward an Interpretation of the Shema". In Theological Exegesis: Essays in Honor of Brevard S. Child. Edited by Christopher Seitz and Kathryn Greene-McCreight, pages 124–44. Grand Rapids, Michigan: William B. Eerdmans Publishing Company, 1999.
David Noel Freedman. The Nine Commandments: Uncovering a Hidden Pattern of Crime and Punishment in the Hebrew Bible. New York: Doubleday, 2000.
Richard D. Nelson. "Deuteronomy." In The HarperCollins Bible Commentary. Edited by James L. Mays, pages 191–92, 194–99. New York: HarperCollins Publishers, revised edition, 2000.
Rochelle Robins. "‘A Land Flowing with Milk and Honey': Sexualizing the Land." In The Women's Torah Commentary: New Insights from Women Rabbis on the 54 Weekly Torah Portions. Edited by Elyse Goldstein, pages 338–44. Woodstock, Vermont: Jewish Lights Publishing, 2000.
Robert F. Shedinger. "A Note on the Variant Form of the Shema in the Writings of Justin Martyr." Harvard Theological Review, volume 93 (number 2) (April 2000): pages 161–63.
Lainie Blum Cogan and Judy Weiss. Teaching Haftarah: Background, Insights, and Strategies, pages 253–62. Denver: A.R.E. Publishing, 2002.
William J. Federer. The Ten Commandments & their Influence on American Law: A Study in History. Amerisearch, 2002.
Michael Fishbane. The JPS Bible Commentary: Haftarot, pages 278–84. Philadelphia: Jewish Publication Society, 2002.

Tikva Frymer-Kensky. "To the Barricades: Views against the Other." In Reading the Women of the Bible, pages 199–208. New York: Schocken Books, 2002. (.).
Admiel Kosman. “The Story of a Giant Story: The Winding Way of Og King of Bashan in the Jewish Haggadic Tradition.” Hebrew Union College Annual, volume 73 (2002): pages 157–90.
John J. Collins. "The Zeal of Phinehas: The Bible and the Legitimation of Violence." Journal of Biblical Literature, volume 122 (number 1) (Spring 2003): pages 3–21. (the ban in ).
Reuven Hammer. Or Hadash: A Commentary on Siddur Sim Shalom for Shabbat and Festivals, page 30. New York: The Rabbinical Assembly, 2003. (mezuzah).
Joseph Telushkin. The Ten Commandments of Character: Essential Advice for Living an Honorable, Ethical, Honest Life, pages 52–59, 61–65, 76–80, 129–32, 177–80, 189–90, 204–06, 275–78. New York: Bell Tower, 2003.
Robert Alter. The Five Books of Moses: A Translation with Commentary, pages 895–918. New York: W.W. Norton & Co., 2004.
Bernard M. Levinson. "Deuteronomy." In The Jewish Study Bible. Edited by Adele Berlin and Marc Zvi Brettler, pages 370–83. New York: Oxford University Press, 2004.
Sheryl Nosan-Blank. "Haftarat Va’etchanan: Isaiah 40:1–26." In The Women's Haftarah Commentary: New Insights from Women Rabbis on the 54 Weekly Haftarah Portions, the 5 Megillot & Special Shabbatot. Edited by Elyse Goldstein, pages 216–20. Woodstock, Vermont: Jewish Lights Publishing, 2004.
The Ten Commandments: The Reciprocity of Faithfulness. Edited by William P. Brown. Louisville, Kentucky: Westminster John Knox Press, 2004.
Sidnie W. Crawford. "Reading Deuteronomy in the Second Temple Period." In Reading the Present in the Qumran Library: The Perception of the Contemporary by Means of Scriptural Interpretations." Edited by Kristin De Troyer and Armin Lange, pages 127–40. Atlanta: Society of Biblical Literature, 2005.Professors on the Parashah: Studies on the Weekly Torah Reading Edited by Leib Moscovitz, pages 304–10. Jerusalem: Urim Publications, 2005.
Gerald J. Blidstein. Honor Thy Father and Mother: Filial Responsibility in Jewish Law and Ethics: Augmented Edition. New York: Ktav, 2006.
Walter J. Harrelson. The Ten Commandments for Today. Louisville, Kentucky: Westminster John Knox Press, 2006.
W. Gunther Plaut. The Torah: A Modern Commentary: Revised Edition. Revised edition edited by David E.S. Stern, pages 1184–225. New York: Union for Reform Judaism, 2006.
Suzanne A. Brody. "Shabbat" and "Intermarriage." In Dancing in the White Spaces: The Yearly Torah Cycle and More Poems, pages 51–57, 103. Shelbyville, Kentucky: Wasteland Press, 2007.
Esther Jungreis. Life Is a Test, pages 86–89, 116–19, 147–48, 154, 163, 166, 169, 219, 248–49, 257–58, 266. Brooklyn: Shaar Press, 2007.
James L. Kugel. How To Read the Bible: A Guide to Scripture, Then and Now, pages 32, 166, 245, 250–59, 291, 298, 308, 311–12, 319–20, 340–45, 348, 355, 357, 369, 371, 432, 579, 621, 647, 650, 684. New York: Free Press, 2007.
Michael D. Matlock. “Obeying the First Part of the Tenth Commandment: Applications from the Levirate Marriage Law.” Journal for the Study of the Old Testament, volume 31 (number 3) (March 2007): pages 295–310.
Adam Potkay. "Icons and Iconoclasm from Moses to Milton." Lecture 3 in The Modern Scholar: The Bible and the Roots of Western Literature. Prince Frederick, Maryland: Recorded Books, 2008.The Torah: A Women's Commentary. Edited by Tamara Cohn Eskenazi and Andrea L. Weiss, pages 1063–88. New York: URJ Press, 2008.
Christopher R. Bruno. “A Note Pertaining to the Translation of Deut 6:4.” Vetus Testamentum, volume 59 (number 2) (2009): pages 320–22
Eugene E. Carpenter. "Deuteronomy." In Zondervan Illustrated Bible Backgrounds Commentary. Edited by John H. Walton, volume 1, pages 440–62. Grand Rapids, Michigan: Zondervan, 2009.
Reuven Hammer. Entering Torah: Prefaces to the Weekly Torah Portion, pages 257–62. New York: Gefen Publishing House, 2009.
Ziv Hellman. "And on the Seventh Day: Israelis ponder the public nature of the Shabbath in a state that seeks to be both Jewish and democratic." The Jerusalem Report, volume 20 (number 19) (January 4, 2009): pages 26–30.
Timothy Keller. Counterfeit Gods: The Empty Promises of Money, Sex, and Power, and the Only Hope that Matters. Dutton Adult, 2009. (What is an idol? It is anything more important to you than God, anything that absorbs your heart and imagination more than God, anything you seek to give you what only God can give.).
Patrick D. Miller. The Ten Commandments: Interpretation: Resources for the Use of Scripture in the Church. Louisville, Kentucky: Westminster John Knox Press, 2009.
Frank Newport. "Extramarital Affairs, Like Sanford's, Morally Taboo: Recent Confessions of Affairs by Elected Officials Fly in Face of Americans' Normative Standards" Gallup Inc. June 25, 2009.
Julie Pelc. "Rethinking the Wicked 'Son': Parashat Vaetchanan (Deuteronomy 3:23–7:11)." In Torah Queeries: Weekly Commentaries on the Hebrew Bible. Edited by Gregg Drinkwater, Joshua Lesser, and David Shneer; foreword by Judith Plaskow, pages 235–39. New York: New York University Press, 2009.
Julie Cadwallader-Staub. Joy. In Face to Face: A Poetry Collection. DreamSeeker Books, 2010. ("land of milk and honey").

Idan Dershowitz. “A Land Flowing with Fat and Honey.” Vetus Testamentum, volume 60 (number 2) (2010): pages 172–76.
Ilan Stavans and Mordecai Drache. "Shema Ysrael!" In With All Thine Heart: Love and the Bible, pages 1–23. Rutgers University Press, 2010.
Joseph Telushkin. Hillel: If Not Now, When? pages 55–57. New York: Nextbook, Schocken, 2010. (honoring father and mother).
"Day of Rest: Judith Shulevitz's New Book Considers the Sabbath Throughout the Ages and in Her Own Life." In Tablet Magazine. (March 15, 2010).
"Body Image: An Art Historian Tackles the Thorny Matter of Jews and Figurative Painting." In Tablet Magazine. (June 7, 2010). (the commandment not to make graven images and Jewish artists).
Bill T. Arnold. “The Love-Fear Antinomy in Deuteronomy 5–11.” Vetus Testamentum, volume 61 (number 4) (2011): pages 551–69.
James S. A. Corey. Leviathon Wakes, chapter 44. Orbit, 2011. ("He knew the story of Moses seeing a promised land he would never enter. Miller wondered how the old prophet would've felt if he'd been ushered in for moment, a day, a week, a year, and then dropped back out into the desert. Kinder never to leave the wastelands. Safer.")

Judah Kraut. "Deciphering the Shema: Staircase Parallelism and the Syntax of Deuteronomy 6:4." Vetus Testamentum, volume 61 (number 4) (2011): pages 582–602.
Joe Lieberman and David Klinghoffer. The Gift of Rest: Rediscovering the Beauty of the Sabbath. New York: Howard Books, 2011.The Decalogue through the Centuries: From the Hebrew Scriptures to Benedict XVI. Edited by Jeffrey P. Greenman and Timothy Larsen. Louisville, Kentucky: Westminster John Knox Press, 2012.
William G. Dever. The Lives of Ordinary People in Ancient Israel: When Archaeology and the Bible Intersect, pages 43–44, 192, 290, 312. Grand Rapids, Michigan: William B. Eerdmans Publishing Company, 2012.

Jonathan Haidt. The Righteous Mind: Why Good People Are Divided by Politics and Religion, page 256. New York: Pantheon, 2012. (prohibition of murder, adultery, false witness, and oath-breaking as an evolutionary advantage).
Shmuel Herzfeld. "Did Moshe Sin?" In Fifty-Four Pick Up: Fifteen-Minute Inspirational Torah Lessons, pages 257–61. Jerusalem: Gefen Publishing House, 2012.
Daniel S. Nevins. "The Use of Electrical and Electronic Devices on Shabbat." New York: Rabbinical Assembly, 2012.
Adam Kirsch. "Ancient Laws for Modern Times: When is a tent just a tent and not like a bed or a hat? To update Jewish laws, the rabbis reasoned by analogy." Tablet Magazine. (February 26, 2013). (Shabbat).
Adam Kirsch. "Leave the Jewish People Alone: Rabbis left enforcement of their Talmudic decrees to communal standards and voluntary commitment." Tablet Magazine. (March 5, 2013). (Shabbat).
Adam Kirsch. "Written in the Stars (Or Not): To overcome fated lives, the Talmud's rabbis argued, perform virtuous acts according to Torah." Tablet Magazine. (March 12, 2013). (Shabbat).
Adam Kirsch. "Navigating the Talmud's Alleys: The range of problems and the variety of answers in the study of Oral Law lead to new pathways of reasoning." Tablet Magazine. (March 18, 2013). (Shabbat).

Noah Wiener. "The Shema‘ Yisrael: Monotheistic Jewish Amulet Discovered Near Carnuntum." Bible History Daily (blog of Biblical Archaeology Review). (April 12, 2013).
Leon R. Kass. "The Ten Commandments: Why the Decalogue Matters." Mosaic Magazine. (June 2013).
Peter Berkowitz. "The Decalogue and Liberal Democracy: Response to: ‘The Ten Commandments.'" Mosaic Magazine. (June 2013).
Haim O. Rechnitzer. "Unconditional Love: Distinguishing between the love of God and the love of country." The Jerusalem Report, volume 24 (number 8) (July 10, 2013): page 47.

Amiel Ungar. "Tel Aviv and the Sabbath." The Jerusalem Report, volume 24 (number 8) (July 29, 2013): page 37.
Pope Francis. "No to the new idolatry of money." In Evangelii gaudium (The Joy of the Gospel). Vatican City: The Holy See, 2013.
United Nations Office on Drugs and Crime. Global Study on Homicide. Vienna, 2013.
Amanda Terkel. "Glenn Grothman, Wisconsin GOP Senator, Fights for a Seven-Day Workweek." The Huffington Post. (January 3, 2014, updated January 23, 2014). (Congressional candidate said, "Right now in Wisconsin, you're not supposed to work seven days in a row, which is a little ridiculous because all sorts of people want to work seven days a week.")
Ester Bloom. "The Crazy New App for Using Your iPhone on Shabbos."  Jewniverse. (October 1, 2014).

Charles Kopel. "The Haftarah Reading That Inspired Martin Luther King Jr.’s ‘I Have a Dream’: King’s speech draws on a part of Isaiah that Jews recite after Tisha B’Av — offering a model for revitalizing his mission." Tablet Magazine. (January 13, 2014).
Shlomo Riskin. Torah Lights: Devarim: Moses Bequeaths Legacy, History, and Covenant, pages 31–73. New Milford, Connecticut: Maggid Books, 2014.The Commentators' Bible: The Rubin JPS Miqra'ot Gedolot: Deuteronomy. Edited, translated, and annotated by Michael Carasik, pages 26–55. Philadelphia: Jewish Publication Society, 2015.
"The Crazy New Invention for Using Electricity on Shabbat."  Jewniverse. (April 21, 2015).

Jonathan Sacks. Lessons in Leadership: A Weekly Reading of the Jewish Bible, pages 247–50. New Milford, Connecticut: Maggid Books, 2015.
"The Hittites: Between Tradition and History." Biblical Archaeology Review, volume 42 (number 2) (March/April 2016): pages 28–40, 68.
Jean-Pierre Isbouts. Archaeology of the Bible: The Greatest Discoveries From Genesis to the Roman Era, pages 114–20. Washington, D.C.: National Geographic, 2016.
Jonathan Sacks. Essays on Ethics: A Weekly Reading of the Jewish Bible, pages 281–85. New Milford, Connecticut: Maggid Books, 2016.
Kenneth Seeskin. Thinking about the Torah: A Philosopher Reads the Bible, pages 153–69. Philadelphia: The Jewish Publication Society, 2016.
Shai Held. The Heart of Torah, Volume 2: Essays on the Weekly Torah Portion: Leviticus, Numbers, and Deuteronomy, pages 209–19. Philadelphia: Jewish Publication Society, 2017.
Steven Levy and Sarah Levy. The JPS Rashi Discussion Torah Commentary, pages 152–55. Philadelphia: Jewish Publication Society, 2017.
Ernst Wendland. Deuteronomy: translationNotes. Orlando, Florida: unfoldingWord, 2017.
John Barton. “The Ten Commandments.” In A History of the Bible, pages 77–79. New York: Viking Press, 2019.
Ralph Allan Smith. “The Third Commandment in Deuteronomy 14:1–21.”
Julia Rhyder. "Sabbath and Sanctuary Cult in the Holiness Legislation: A Reassessment." Journal of Biblical Literature, volume 138, number 4 (2019): pages 721–40.
Cat Quine. "The Host of Heaven and the Divine Army: A Reassessment." Journal of Biblical Literature, volume 138, number 4 (2019): pages 741–55.
Jonathan Sacks. Covenant & Conversation: A Weekly Reading of the Jewish Bible: Deuteronomy: Renewal of the Sinai Covenant'', pages 49–83. New Milford, Connecticut: Maggid Books, 2019.

External links

Texts
Masoretic text and 1917 JPS translation
Hear the parashah chanted 
Hear the parashah read in Hebrew

Commentaries

Academy for Jewish Religion, New York
Aish.com 
Akhlah: The Jewish Children's Learning Network 
Aleph Beta Academy
American Jewish University — Ziegler School of Rabbinic Studies
Anshe Emes Synagogue, Los Angeles 
Ari Goldwag
Ascent of Safed
Bar-Ilan University 
Chabad.org
eparsha.com
G-dcast
The Israel Koschitzky Virtual Beit Midrash
Jewish Agency for Israel
Jewish Theological Seminary
Kabbala Online
Mechon Hadar
Miriam Aflalo 
MyJewishLearning.com
Ohr Sameach
Orthodox Union
OzTorah, Torah from Australia
Oz Ve Shalom — Netivot Shalom
Pardes from Jerusalem
Professor James L. Kugel
Professor Michael Carasik 
Rabbi Jonathan Sacks
RabbiShimon.com 
Rabbi Shlomo Riskin
Rabbi Shmuel Herzfeld
Rabbi Stan Levin 
Reconstructionist Judaism 
Sephardic Institute
Shiur.com
613.org Jewish Torah Audio
Tanach Study Center
Teach613.org, Torah Education at Cherry Hill 
TheTorah.com
Torah from Dixie 
Torah.org
TorahVort.com
Union for Reform Judaism
United Synagogue of Conservative Judaism 
What's Bothering Rashi?
Yeshiva University
Yeshivat Chovevei Torah

Weekly Torah readings in Av
Weekly Torah readings from Deuteronomy